= History of the Jews in Łuków =

Łuków's crest

The history of the Jews in Łuków, Poland spans from the 15th to 20th century. The community flourished from the 18th-early 20th century, following the confirmation of certain privileges granted to Polish Jews in 1659. The community had its own Synagogues, Yeshivas, beit midrash, mikveh, schools, and community center. By the 19th century, the majority of the general population of Łuków was Jewish, with many people working in a shoe factory. Members of the community followed various movements, including Hasidic Judaism, socialism, labor movements, and Zionism. The majority of the Jewish community of Łuków was murdered in the Holocaust. There were only about 150 survivors in total, most of whom had left for the Soviet Union.

== Early history (15th–17th century) ==
At the turn of the 15th century, Jews began to settle in Łuków. Some sources claim that Jews came as early as the mid-13th century. By the 16th century, an organized Jewish community was in place. The first synagogue in the town was built in the 16th century, although it later burned down in a fire. In 1648, the Khmelnytsky Uprising as part of the Cossack uprisings, led by Bohdan Khmelnytsky, resulted in attacks and heavy losses for the Jewish community of Łuków, which also saw numerous marches and stopovers by armies. In 1655, the Jewish community experienced a pogrom, which had been organized by the Muscovites and impacted many parts of Poland. The local community of Łuków had 1000 deaths. The new synagogue was set on fire and many Jewish households were also destroyed. This was followed by the Swedish Deluge (1657), during the war between Poland and Sweden, which involved invasions ordered by King Carl Gustav and his Transylvanian ally, the Rakocy prince. This period brought fatal effects to the town. In April 1657, the town was totally devastated by the invasion of Swedish and Transylvanian troops, and about 1000 Jews lost their lives.

== Privileges and reconstruction (17th–18th century) ==
In 1659, King Jan Kazimierz Waza granted certain privileges to the Jews of Poland. This included the right to acquire real estate, conduct business, and produce and sell Alcoholic drinks. These laws helped facilitate the growth of the town, and by 1676, Łuków had one of the largest Jewish communities in the region.

In the 1760s–1770s, the Jewish community of Łuków focused on rebuilding the town. In 1765, 543 Jewish people (137 families) lived in Łuków. In the latter half of the 18th century, Łuków experienced an economic boom. Jews typically lived in the Market Square and on Kozia Street, with some living on Browarna Street. Some rented three taverns in Jurydyka, which was a settlement outside a royal city. The center of Jewish life in Łuków was found between Brzeska, Kościelna, and Trzebieska Streets. Two new synagogues were built, with one located at the corner of Staropijarska and Bóżnicza Streets. A beit midrash and mikveh were also located on Trzebieska Street.

== 19th century ==
By the 19th century, the Jewish population saw population growth. By 1827, the number of Jewish people grew to 2,023 (which accounted for 60% of the town population). In 1857, there were 2,114 Jewish people (68% of the town population). By the mid-19th century, the Jewish community owned a synagogue, a brick beit midrash, a wooden mikvah (located on Staropijarska Street), and a two-room wooden shelter.

During this period, Hasidic Judaism was very popular in the Jewish community. The town had a few shtibelekh, which were meeting places for the supporters from Kock, Radzyń Podlaski, Aleksandrów Łódzki, and Góra Kalwaria.

By 1897, there were 4,799 Jewish people (55% of the town population).

== Early 20th century ==
In 1901, Szmuel Szlomi Braun became the rabbi of the town. He ran a popular yeshiva in town.

In 1905, the Russian Revolution left a profound impact on many Jews of Łuków, most of whom were poor. Common professions were tailor, shoemaker, baker, and porter. According to the accounts of Shloyme Rubinshteyn, some members of the town became socialists and labor activists. A man named Yakov (the son of Moshe Kiwi), the brothers and sisters Luterman, and others created a Bund. However, many of the members of the Bund eventually fled to the United States, due to the repressive tactics of the Czar's authorities.

From 1906 to 1907, the town saw economic growth, as multiple factories opened. In 1906, Gastman's shoe factory, originally from Warsaw, relocated to Łuków. This helped bring an economic revival to the town, and it employed hundreds of town residents. A small shoe factory was opened by Yosef Mendel Hochman and an album factory was opened by Meir Liberman. These two factories employed dozens of workers.

In 1906, a mansion was built for Hersz Morgenstern, the great-grandson Mendel Morgenstern (the tzaddik of Kock), in Łuków.

During this period, the Zionist movement became increasingly popular in Łuków. Under the leadership of Hershel Eisenberg, lessons were taught to residents about Israel and Zionism. A library was also established, although it wasn't legal to do so. In 1912, the library brought Hillel Zeitlin to speak. Later, Reuben Brainin was also brought to speak. In 1914, the first public concert in the town was arranged, which consisted of Jewish folk music and took place at the Dom Ludowy (community center). The group hoped to establish a legal library, but the request was rejected by Czarist authorities.

== WWI ==
With the outbreak of WWI, most small businesses ceased operation in Łuków. Gastman's shoe factory only operated part-time. As a result, many Jewish families lost their income. In 1915, Poland was occupied by the Austrian army, which the Jewish population generally preferred over the Cossacks (due to their pogroms). The Austrian forces later left, and the German forces took their place. The Germans evacuated Jews from Brisk and dispersed them to other towns, including Łuków. Volunteer programs were set up to help provide food and shelter to the new homeless Jews who had arrived in town. A typhus epidemic broke out, and the town was given permission to build a hospital by the German authorities.

The residents of Łuków began to grow accustomed to German occupation, and remnants of their former lives before the war began to resume. In 1916, political parties began to sprout up, starting with the Bund and the youth group, Bund – Tsukunft (future). They invited various lecturers from Warsaw to speak. The Folkspartei ("Jewish People's Party") was also established. Other groups were the Poalei Zion Right with the Hapoel sports club. Other groups were the General Zionists and the Hashomer Hatzair, which organized lectures and many Jewish youth activities.

In 1918, WWI ended and Poland became an independent state.

== Interwar period ==
Following WWI, the Jewish community of Łuków received a letter promising financial support from the American Jewish community. The Bund met to discuss how to distribute the money. They agreed by majority to distribute the money to the town's poor population through goods. Most political groups supported the measure, except for Agudat Yisrael and the General Zionists. During this time, there was notable political organizing among various socialist, communist, and labor groups in Łuków. As recalled by Shloyme Rubinshteyn, in discussing a meeting of the period, "Red flags flew. The speeches were given in Polish and Yiddish. It was a striking picture. Everyone believed that a new era of truth and justice for all people has arrived."

Other political groups also flourished in this period. Some of the most active included the General Zionist Party, Poale Zion Right, Mizrachi, Folkspartei, and Aguda. Left-wing Zionist organizations included Tsukunft, Ha-Shomer Ha-Tzair, Hehalutz, and Betar. The most influential group was Aguda, which was Orthodox Jewish, and almost exclusively controlled the Jewish Community Co-operative until 1931.

The interwar period brought increased prosperity for the Jews of Łuków. In 1921, 6,145 Jews lived in Łuków, which accounted for 49% of the total inhabitants. They ran 85% of 530 local industrial and commercial companies and created 30 associations. The Jewish community issued a weekly publication, Dos Łukower Wort, and several issues of Łukower Nayes were published in 1931.

In terms of education, the town offered four private chederim, at least two schools for Talmud Torah, and a private school that went up to the fourth-grade (which was operated by the Mizrachi party). In 1923, the school became a public state school. From 1928 to the mid-1930s, an elementary school (until the fourth grade) was also active in town, and it as run by the TSIShO (Central Yiddish School Organisation).

Economic prospects for Jewish youth were often limited in Łuków. As Shloyme Rubinshteyn, a former resident recalled,

There were two high schools in the city, for boys and for girls, but it was possible to count the Jewish high school students on the fingers – first, because of the high tuition and secondly, because of the anti-Semitic discrimination. For example, I remember a high school student, Reuven Fluman. His father had a shoe store and he has done everything so that his son, a boy with a 'flaming head' will become a 'man.' He was badly abused at school and had to sit in the same class for two years, and after he was severely beaten he had to stop his studies there... It was not a simple matter to 'study a profession.' What was it possible to study in Łuków? – Tailoring and shoemaking. To study one of these professions they had to commit for several years, and I think that it was necessary to pay the shop owner. The situation was worse for the girls because they weren't able to learn anything other than sewing... Because of this situation young men and women left for Warsaw to look for a job. Quite often they wandered around hungry and were ashamed to return home... They bragged about the cinemas, theaters, and the restaurants where they ate, but they weren't able to tell the truth that two of them slept in one bed and at times they didn't have money to buy food.

The interwar period was marked by growing antisemitic actions and commercial boycotts. In 1920, a pogrom took place. In August, when the Polish army was waging a counteroffensive in the war against Bolsheviks, 12 Jews were executed without any trial by the soldiers in the neighborhood of Łuków. The pogrom went on for two days in the town itself. Officers did not try to stop it, allowing soldiers to plunder shops and hit Jewish inhabitants.

With the arrival of the Great Depression in the 1930s, the town began to fall on hard times. Some industrial plants closed down, and unemployment went up. Antisemitism also began to rise, and Polish nationalists rallied for boycotts of Jewish businesses and workshops. Some businesses were devastated at that time. This period also had the last rabbi of Łuków: Aron Nuta Frajberg.

== World War II ==
On 19 September 1939, invading military forces of Nazi Germany seized the town. Some Jews tried to defend the town. German forces shot down several Jewish people and burned down 25 Jewish houses in retaliation. A few days later, the Soviet Army entered the town. In October 1939, the Soviet forces retreated, which resulted in 500 Jews fleeing town.

World War II led to the total extermination of the Jewish community in Łuków. Before this happened, the town was a stopover on the way to the gas chambers for thousands of Jews from the neighboring villages, many Polish towns, and even from other countries. Between November and December 1939, more than 2,500 Jews from Serock, Nasielsk, and Suwałki were displaced to Łuków. A year later, this was followed by almost 1000 Jews from Mława, and, in May 1942, more than 2,000 Jews from Slovakia.

The first mass executions of Łuków Jews started in March 1942. At that time, Germans shot 47 people. In the summer the Jews were forbidden to leave the town. A regular action of liquidation of the Jewish community started on 5 October 1942. On that day, about 4,000 people were transported to the Treblinka extermination camp and about 500 were executed in the town (the last rabbi of the community, Aaron Note Freiberg, was among them). Another 2,000 people were transported to Treblinka on 8 October 1942. After this action, the area of ghetto was decreased and the Jews from the neighboring towns and villages, such as Kock, Wojcieszków, Adamów, Stanin, Tuchowicz, Trzebieszów and Ulan, were forced to come to Łuków. After that, between 26–27 October and between 7–11 November, another 4,000 people were taken to Treblinka. A few hundred more Jews were executed at the court of the Łuków magistrate and in the Jewish cemetery. The Jews who survived were closed in the ghetto at the beginning of December, and there were regular executions. The ghetto was finally liquidated on 2 May 1943, when SS troops deported about 4,000 people to Treblinka.

In summary, from 1942 and 1943, around 14,000 Jews from the Łuków ghetto and the neighboring towns and villages were sent to the gas chambers in Treblinka, and approximately 2,000 Jews were executed in the town. In this way the Jewish community in Łuków ended.

== Survivors ==
Following WWII, it was estimated that about 150 Jews from Łuków survived. The majority had left for the Soviet Union. After the war, many settled in Silesia and later moved to Western Europe, Israel, or the United States. In 1950, only six Jews lived in Łuków. In 1968, a memorial book The Book of Lukow: Dedicated to a Destroyed Community was published in Tel Aviv, Israel, which included memories of former town residents.
