= Borowina =

Borowina may refer to the following places:

- Borowina, Biłgoraj County in Lublin Voivodeship (east Poland)
- Borowina, Łuków County in Lublin Voivodeship (east Poland)
- Borowina, Puławy County in Lublin Voivodeship (east Poland)
- Borowina, Zamość County in Lublin Voivodeship (east Poland)
- Borowina, Subcarpathian Voivodeship (south-east Poland)
- Borowina, Grójec County in Masovian Voivodeship (east-central Poland)
- Borowina, Piaseczno County in Masovian Voivodeship (east-central Poland)
- Borowina, Lubusz Voivodeship (west Poland)
- Borowina, Pomeranian Voivodeship (north Poland)
