= Wesołówka, Łuków County =

Wesołówka
- Village
- Location within Poland
- Coordinates: 51°51′44″N 22°12′35″E
- Country: Poland
- Voivodeship: Lublin
- County: Łuków
- Gmina: Stanin
- Population: 290

Wesołówka [vɛsɔˈwufka] is a village in the administrative district of Gmina Stanin, within Łuków County, Lublin Voivodeship, in eastern Poland.
