= Józefów, Łuków County =

Józefów
- Village
- Location within Poland
- Coordinates: 51°53′42″N 22°15′02″E
- Country: Poland
- Voivodeship: Lublin
- County: Łuków
- Gmina: Stanin
- Time zone: UTC+1 (CET)
  - Summer (DST): UTC+2 (CEST)

Józefów (Polish pronunciation: [juˈzɛfuf]) is a village in the administrative district of Gmina Stanin, within Łuków County, Lublin Voivodeship, in eastern Poland.

== History ==
Five Polish citizens were murdered by Nazi Germany in the village during World War II.
