= Kij =

Kij or KIJ may refer to:

- Kij, Lublin Voivodeship, a Polish village
- Niigata Airport, in Niigata, Japan by IATA code
- Kilivila language, an Austronesian language by ISO 639-3 code

== People with the name ==
- Kij Johnson (born 1960), American author
