= Sarnów, Lublin Voivodeship =

Sarnów
- Village
- Location within Poland
- Coordinates: 51°51′14″N 22°17′59″E
- Country: Poland
- Voivodeship: Lublin
- County: Łuków
- Gmina: Stanin

Sarnów [ˈsarnuf] is a village in the administrative district of Gmina Stanin, within Łuków County, Lublin Voivodeship, in eastern Poland.
