= Łuków =

Town in Lublin Voivodeship, Poland

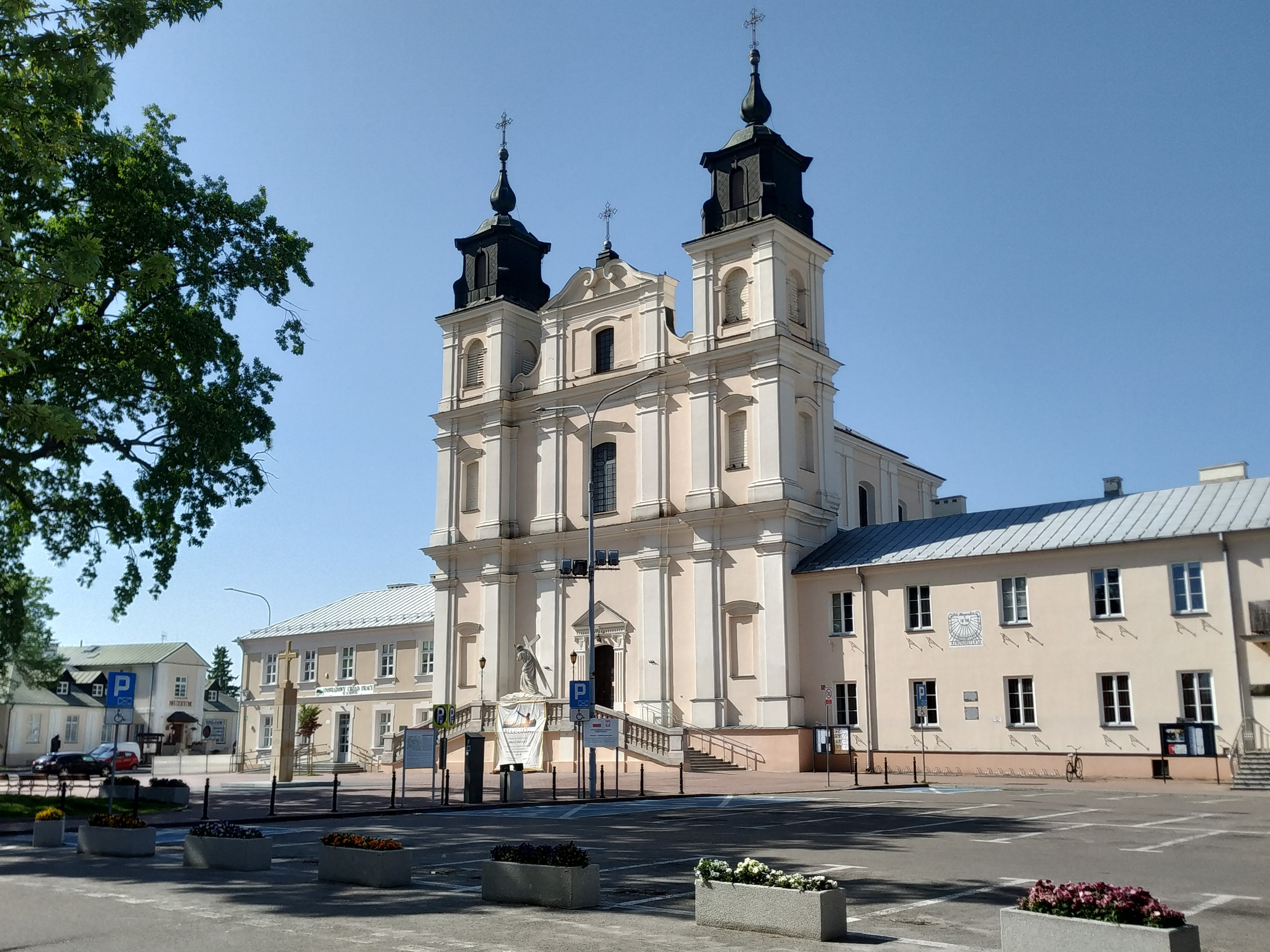
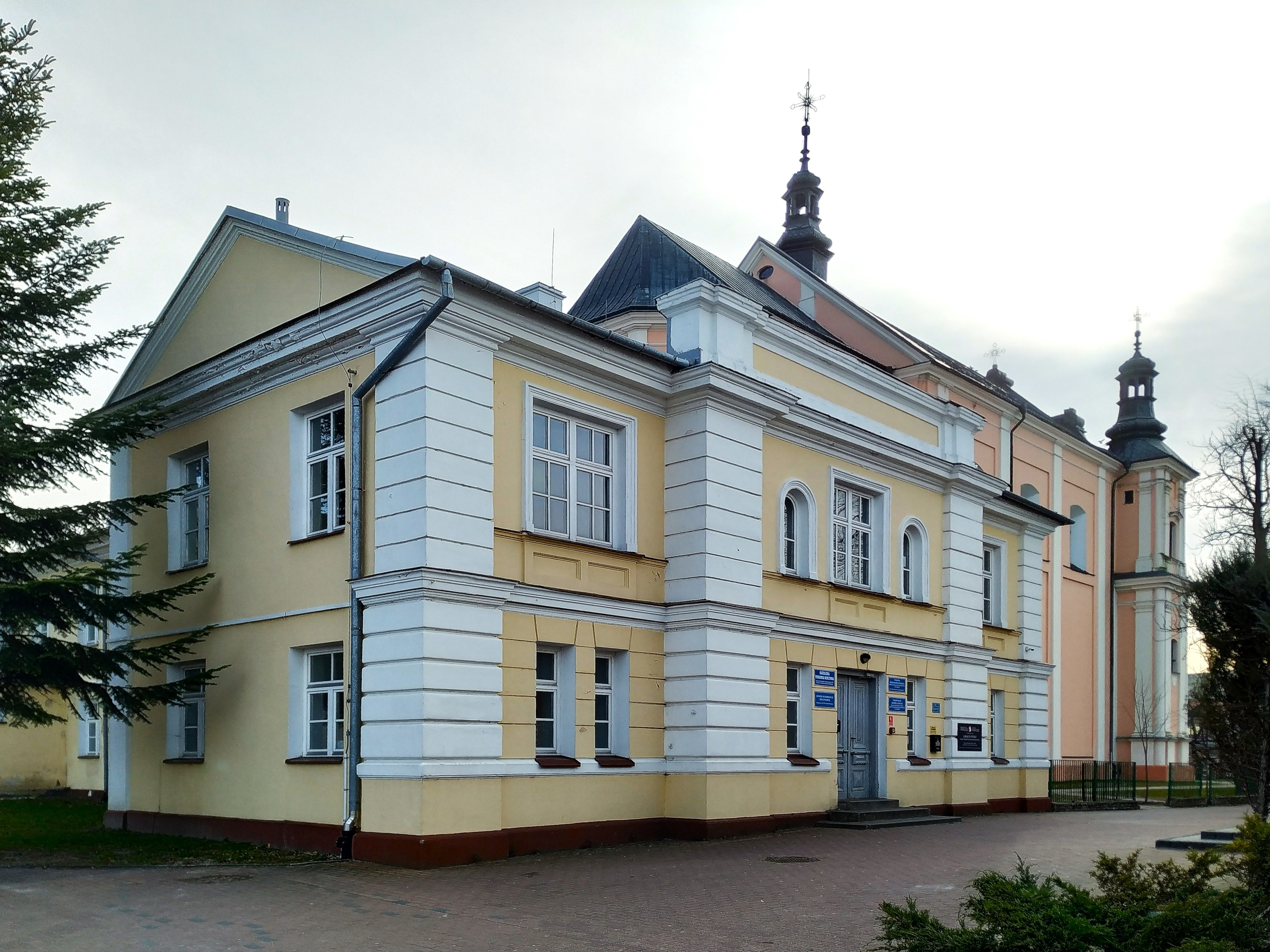
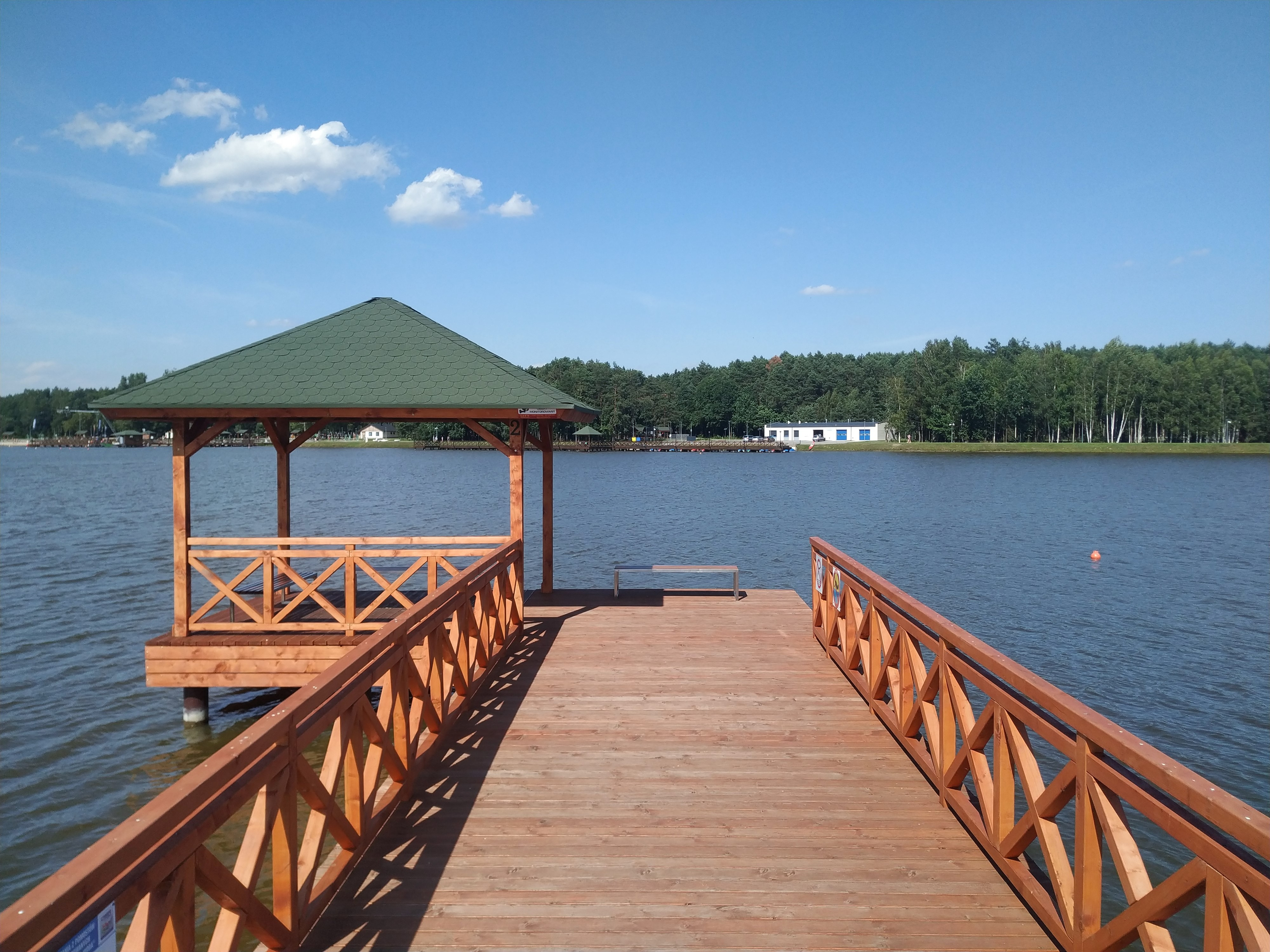
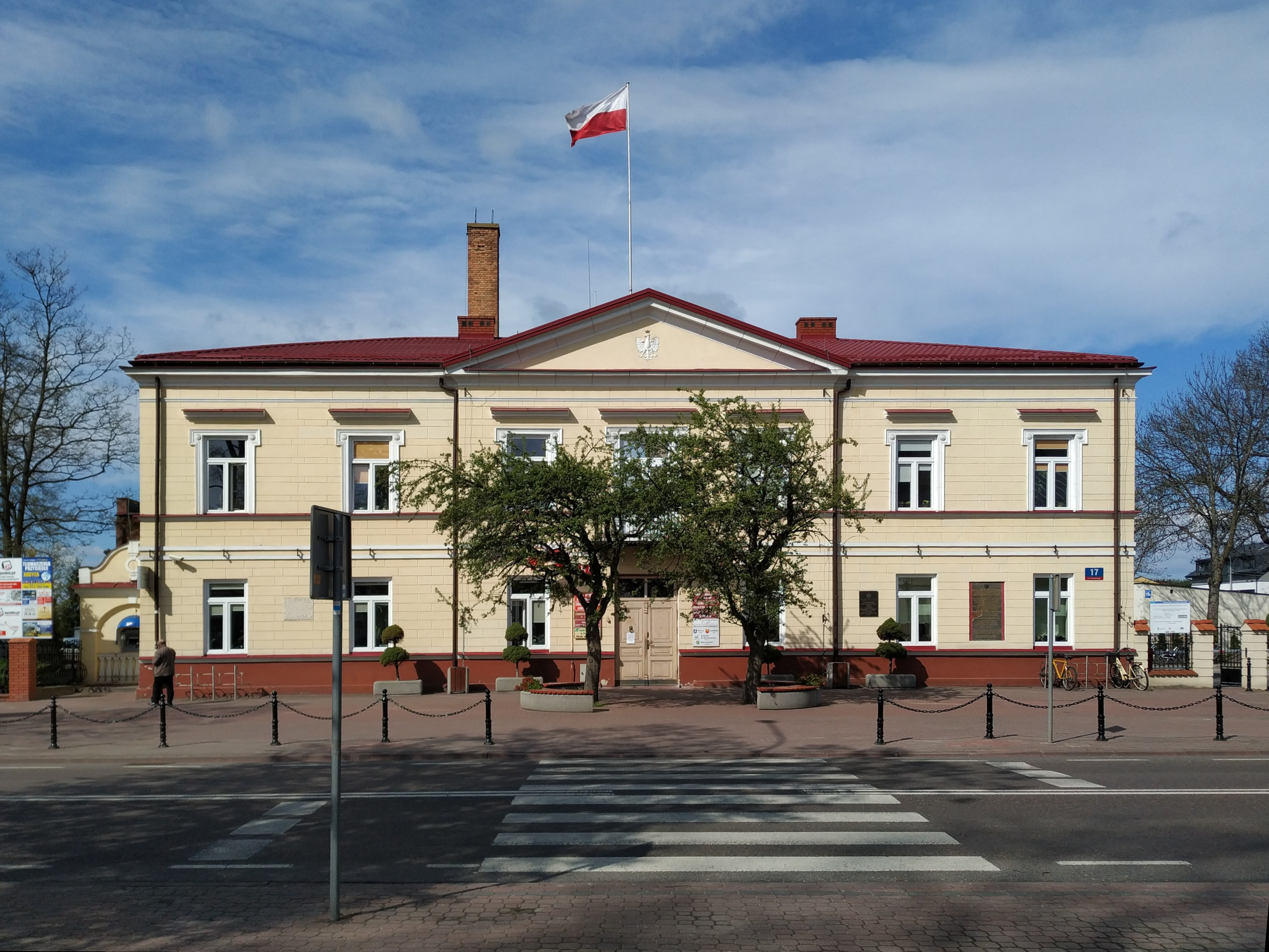
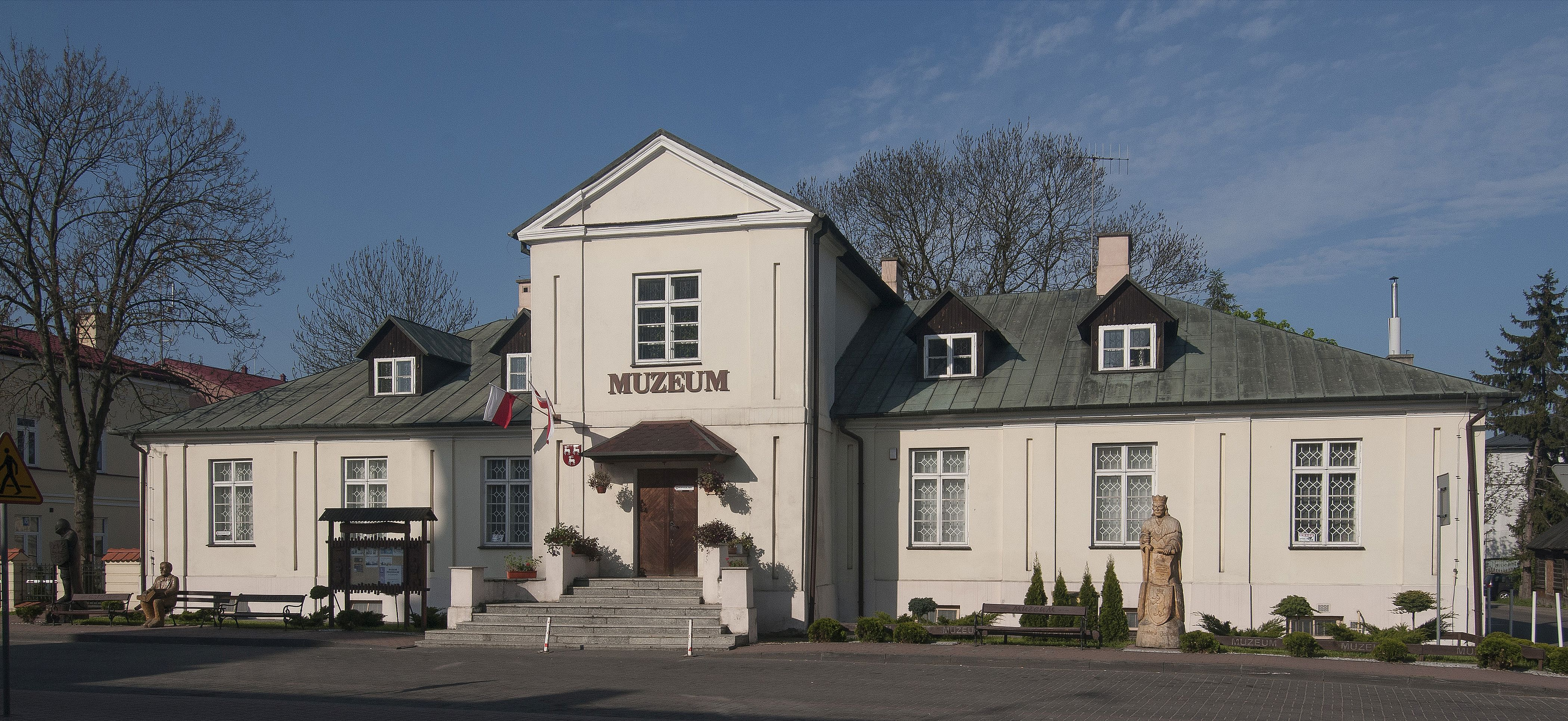
- Collegiate church of Transfiguration Bernardine monastery Zimna Woda Reservoir Town hall Regional Museum

- Flag Coat of arms

- Location within Poland
- Coordinates: 51°55′38″N 22°23′00″E
- Country: Poland
- Voivodeship: Lublin
- County: Łuków
- Gmina: Łuków (urban gmina)

Government
  - Mayor: Piotr Płudowski (Ind.)

Area
  - Total: 35.75 km^{2} (13.80 sq mi)

Population (2006)
  - Total: 30,564
  - Density: 854.9/km^{2} (2,214/sq mi)
- Time zone: UTC+1 (CET)
  - Summer (DST): UTC+1 (CEST)
- Postal code: 21-400
- Car plates: LLU
- Website: www.lukow.pl

Łuków [ˈwukuf] is a town in the Lublin Voivodeship in eastern Poland with 30,727 inhabitants (as of January 1, 2005). It is the capital of Łuków County.

The town has an area of 35.75 km^{2} (13.80 sq mi), of which forests make up 13%. Łuków is located on the Southern Krzna river, at approximately 160 meters above sea level. For 500 years Łuków, together with neighboring towns Siedlce and Radzyń Podlaski, was part of Lesser Poland, and was located in the extreme northeastern corner of the province. Some time in the 19th century, it became associated with another historical region of Poland, Podlasie.

== Etymology ==
The name of the town first appeared in documents in 1233 (Castelani nostri de Lucow). Łuków comes from Old Slavic word łuk, which means "a place located in a wetland".

== History ==
=== Medieval period ===
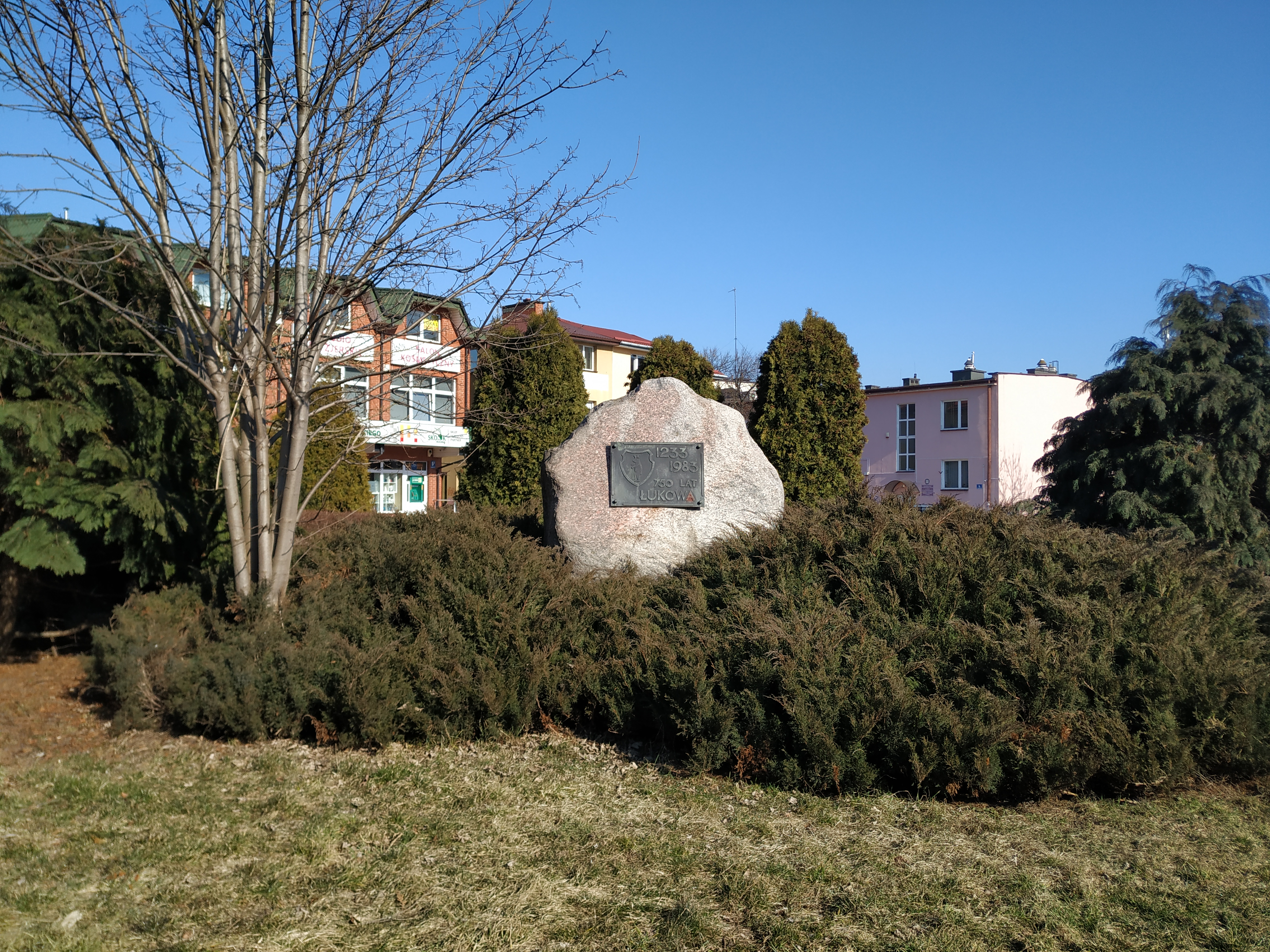
Memorial celebrating the 750th anniversary of the founding of Łuków

Łuków was established as a grod, around the year 1233. It guarded eastern border of the Sandomierz Land, against warring tribes from the East including the Yotvingians and the Lithuanians. In the first half of the 13th century, Łuków was the seat of Lesser Poland's castellany, positioned in a strategic corner of the province. After Duke of Kraków and Sandomierz Bolesław V the Chaste brought here the Knights Templar (1250–1257), a Roman Catholic Diocese of Łuków was established here. It existed for a very short time (1254–1257), and was closed after protests of the Teutonic Knights. In the late Middle Ages, Łuków was frequently invaded and destroyed by the Old Prussians, Yotvingians, Lithuanians, and Tatars. The town life improved only after 1385 (see Union of Krewo), when Poland and Lithuania became allies. In 1403, Łuków was officially granted a charter, codifying its legal status. In 1445, King Casimir IV Jagiellon established weekly markets in Łuków. The town originally belonged to the Sandomierz Voivodeship, but in 1474, it became part of the Lublin Voivodeship.

=== Modern period ===
In the early 16th century, Chancellor of Poland Krzysztof Szydłowiecki fortified the town at his own expense. The town was frequently visited by Polish kings Sigismund I the Old and Sigismund II Augustus. Sigismund II Augustus confirmed old and issued new privileges for Łuków in 1550, 1553, 1555 and 1570.

Łuków frequently burned (1517, 1528, 1530). Its period of prosperity in the first half of the 17th century came to an end after the Swedish Deluge (1655–1660), when it was ransacked and burned by the Swedes. In the second half of the 18th century, Łuków had some 3,000 residents. The town began a slow recovery, but in 1782, in a great fire, it almost completely burned, and as a result, its population decreased by 50%. At that time, Łuków was a prominent center of education in the region. In 1701, Piarist monks opened a college in Łuków, which later became one of the first in Poland to carry out the reforms of the Commission of National Education. Famous students included naturalist, agronomist and entomologist Jan Krzysztof Kluk and philosopher Bronisław Trentowski. In 1775, the Łuków castellania was established by the Sejm with Jacek Jezierski appointed as the castellan.

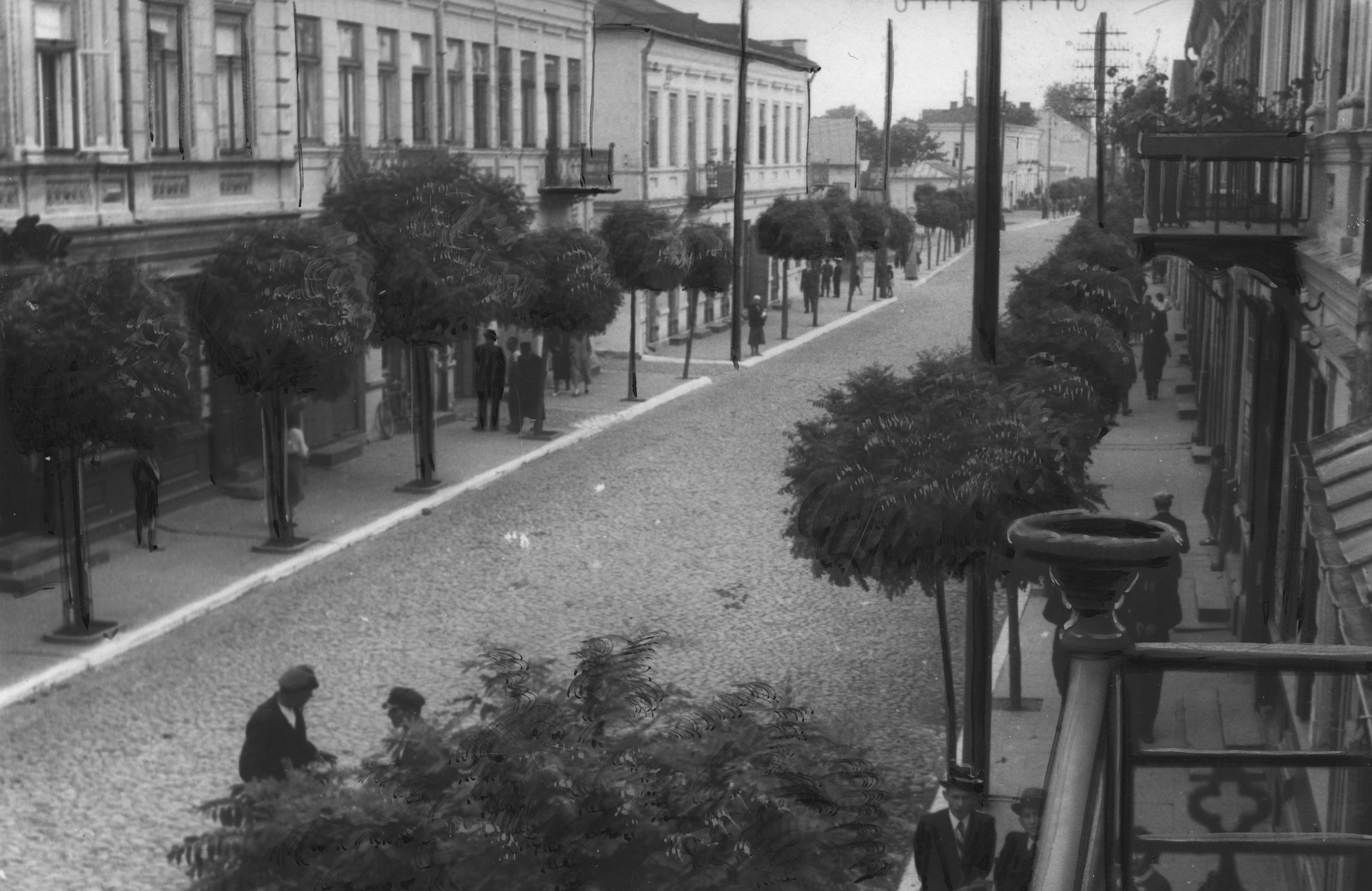
Łuków in 1930

During the Third Partition of Poland, Łuków was annexed by the Austrian Empire (1795). After the Polish victory in the Austro-Polish War of 1809, it became part of the short-lived Duchy of Warsaw, and after the duchy's dissolution in 1815, it was part of Russian-controlled Congress Poland. Its inhabitants took active role in Polish uprisings of the 19th century (November Uprising, January Uprising). Following the November Uprising in 1839, the Patriotic Union, organized by youth from Łuków and Warsaw, operated here. It was led by Karol Levittoux, a graduate of the Łuków high school. The discovery of the "conspiracy" by the Russians was the direct cause of the closure of the high school in Łuków and its relocation to Siedlce in 1844.

After Poland regained its independence as the Second Polish Republic in 1918, Łuków was again assigned to the Lublin Voivodeship. According to the 1921 census, the population of the town was 50.6% Polish and 48.8% Jewish. It was home to a military garrison with several mounted units stationed there.

=== World War II ===
During the German invasion of Poland at the start of World War II, on 4 September 1939, the German Luftwaffe bombed Łuków's train station causing many civilian deaths as a result. Later on, it was occupied by Germany.

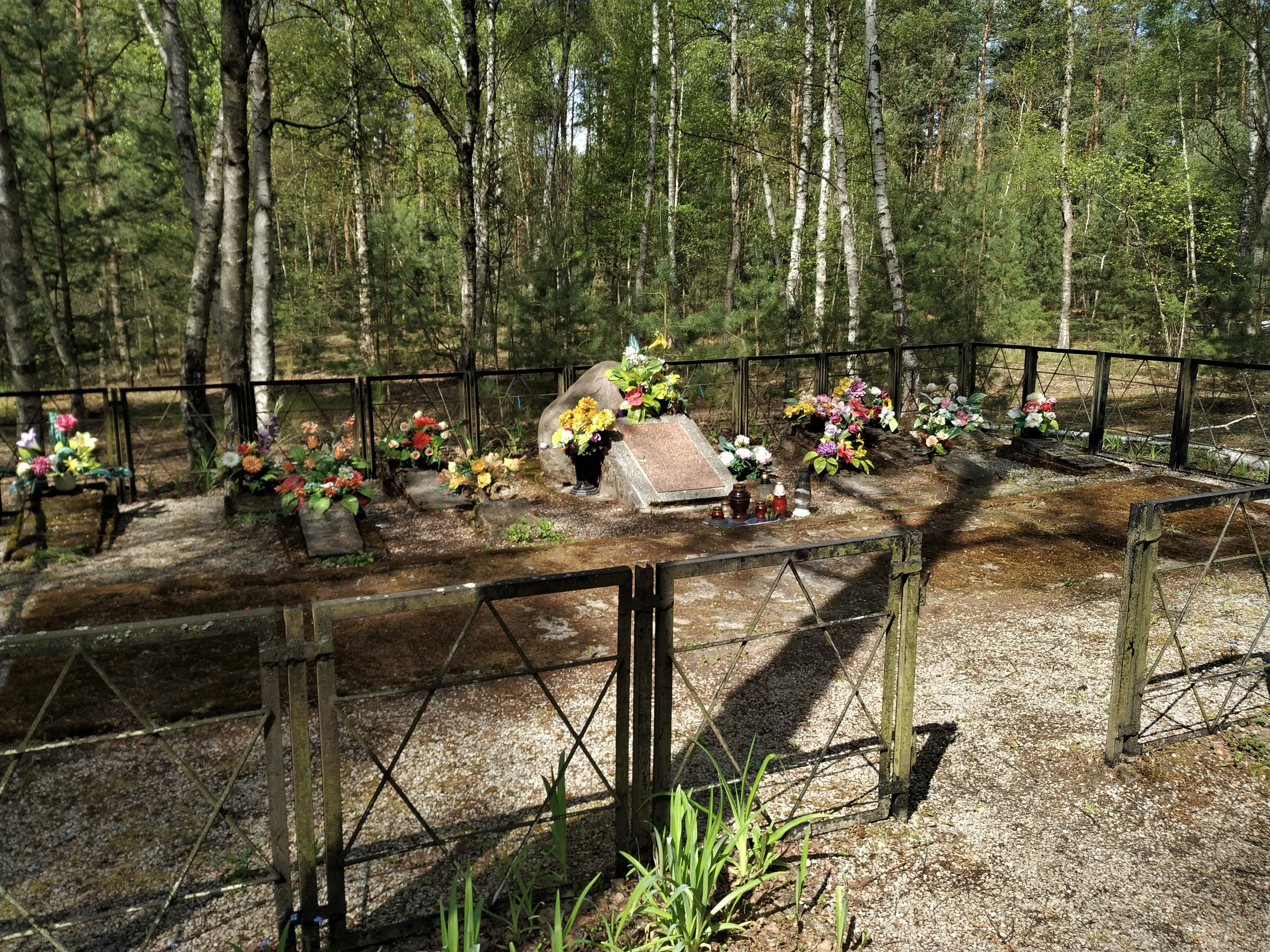
Memorial of the Holocaust victims in Kierkut Forest

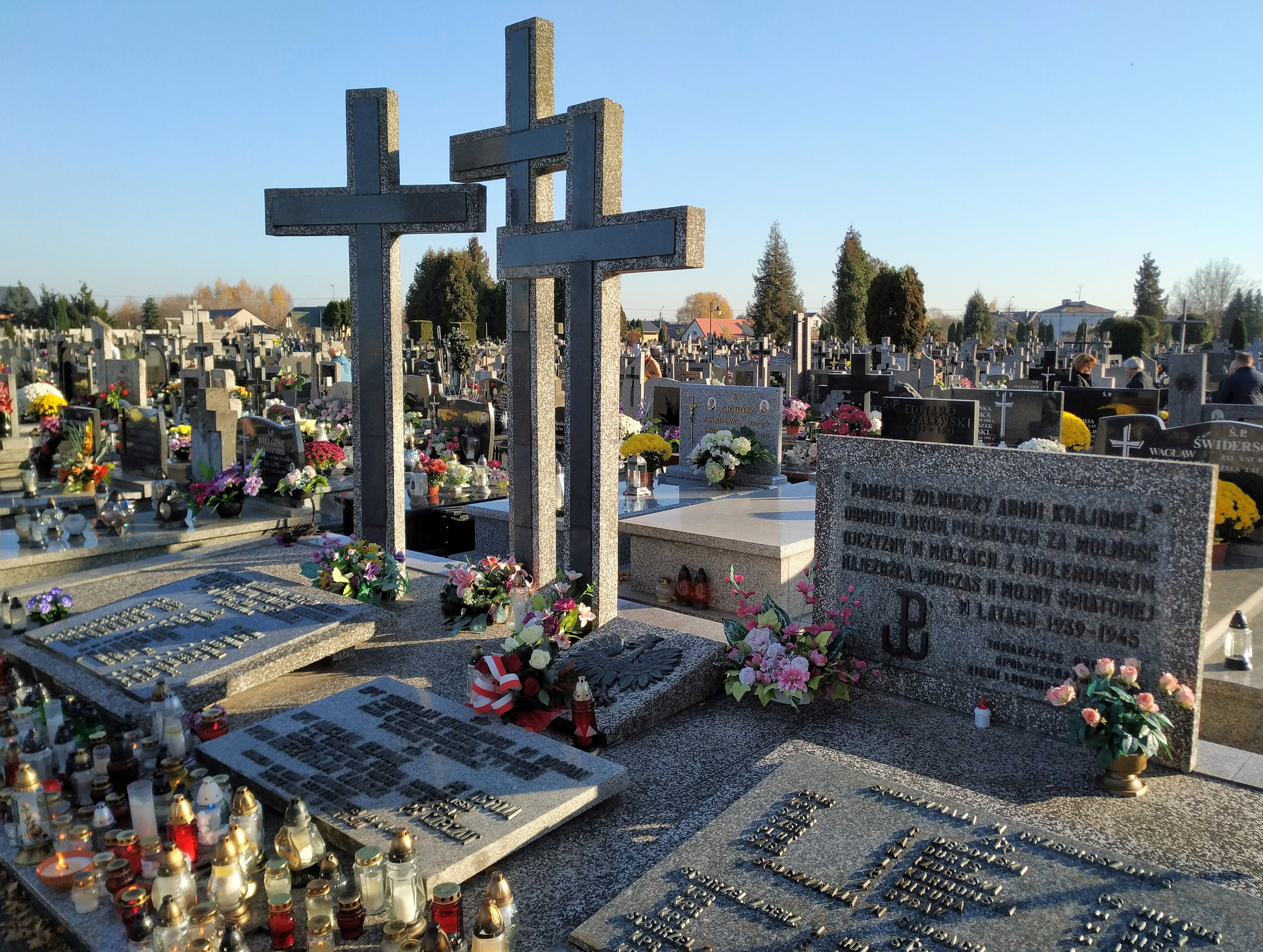
Memorial to local Home Army partisans at the Saint Roch cemetery

In May 1941 a large Jewish ghetto was formed by the German administration. It was fenced-out in mid-September 1942, and liquidated before the end of the same year. The number of inmates was nearly 12,000. Deportations took place on the 5th and 8 October, and the 7th and 8 November. Around 9,000 Jews were put onto Holocaust trains and sent to Treblinka extermination camp where they were murdered. Approximately 2,200 inmates were shot locally into execution pits. On 28 October, more Jews were brought in from Adamów, Wojcieszków, Kock, Tuchowicz, and Trzebieszów, about 4,500 in total. Many were executed locally, while others were sent to Treblinka along with the locals. After the wave of deportations and transfers, the ghetto was rearranged as a slave labor camp for Jewish workers employed in the Gestapo warehouses. In December 1942, approximately 500 of them were shot dead. Five months later, on May 2, 1943, the remaining 3,000–4,000 Jews were transported to Treblinka extermination camp. Only about 150 Jews of Łuków survived the Holocaust, mostly in the USSR. They migrated to Israel, Western Europe, and the United States.

Also, Łuków was an important center of anti-German resistance (see Home Army).

In 1944, the German occupation ended, and town was restored to Poland, although with a Soviet-installed communist regime, which stayed in power until the Fall of Communism in the 1980s.

=== Post-World War II ===
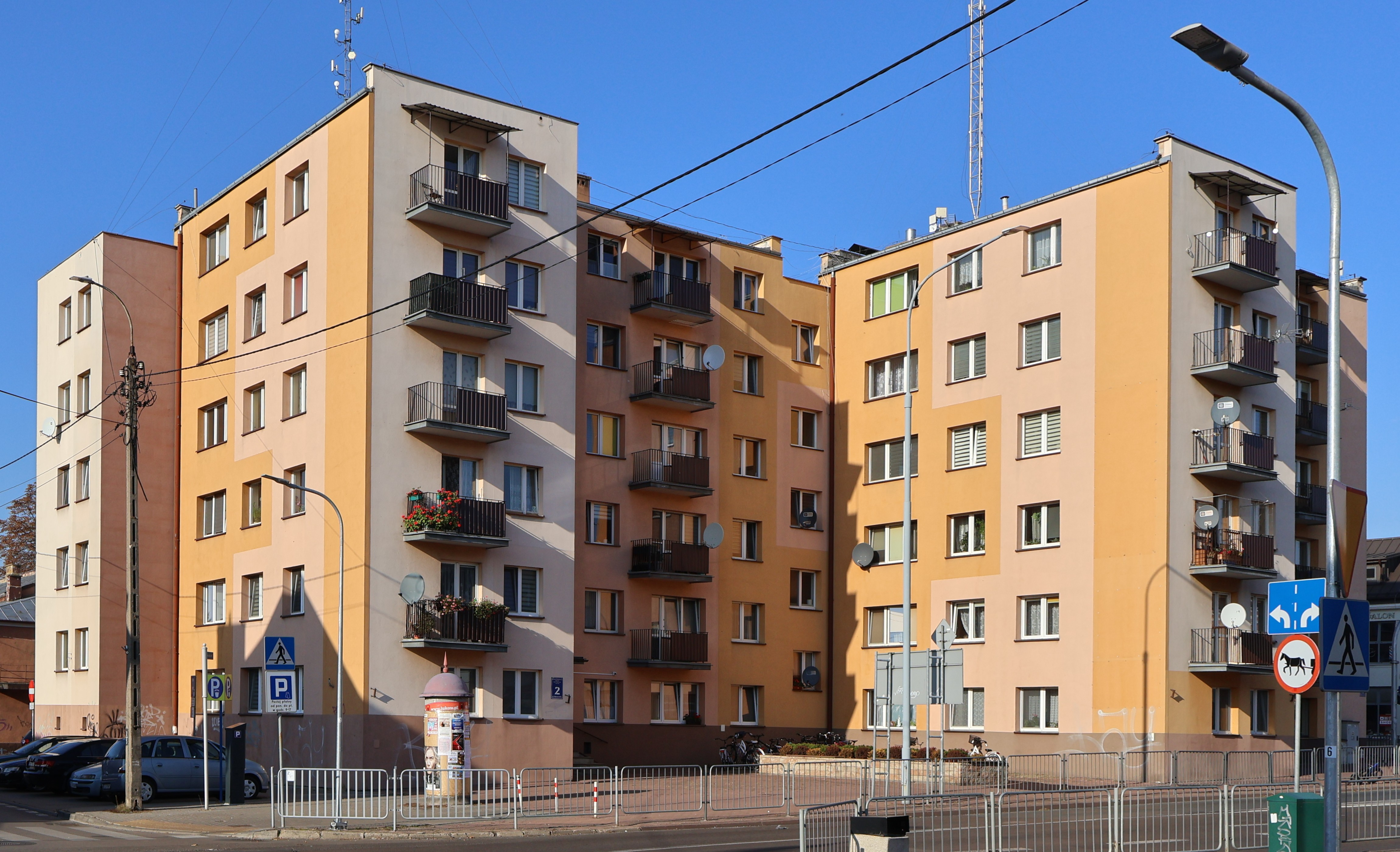
Post-war housing in Łuków

In the following years, the Polish anti-communist resistance was active in the town and its environs, including the Home Army, Armed Forces Delegation for Poland and Freedom and Independence Association. On 24 January 1946, partisans of the Freedom and Independence Association broke into the local communist prison and liberated 27 prisoners.

After the war, two large factories were built in town: the "Lukbut" shoe factory and a meat plant owned by Henryk Stokłosa.

From 1975 to 1998, it administratively belonged to the Siedlce Voivodeship.

== Sights ==
- Bernardine monastery and Exaltation of the Holy Cross church (second half of the 18th century)
- Late Baroque Collegiate Church of Transfiguration (1733–1762)
- Regional Museum
- Zimna Woda Reservoir
- Municipal Park
- January Uprising Monument
- Memorials to Henryk Sienkiewicz
- World War I and Polish–Soviet War cemetery
- World War II memorials
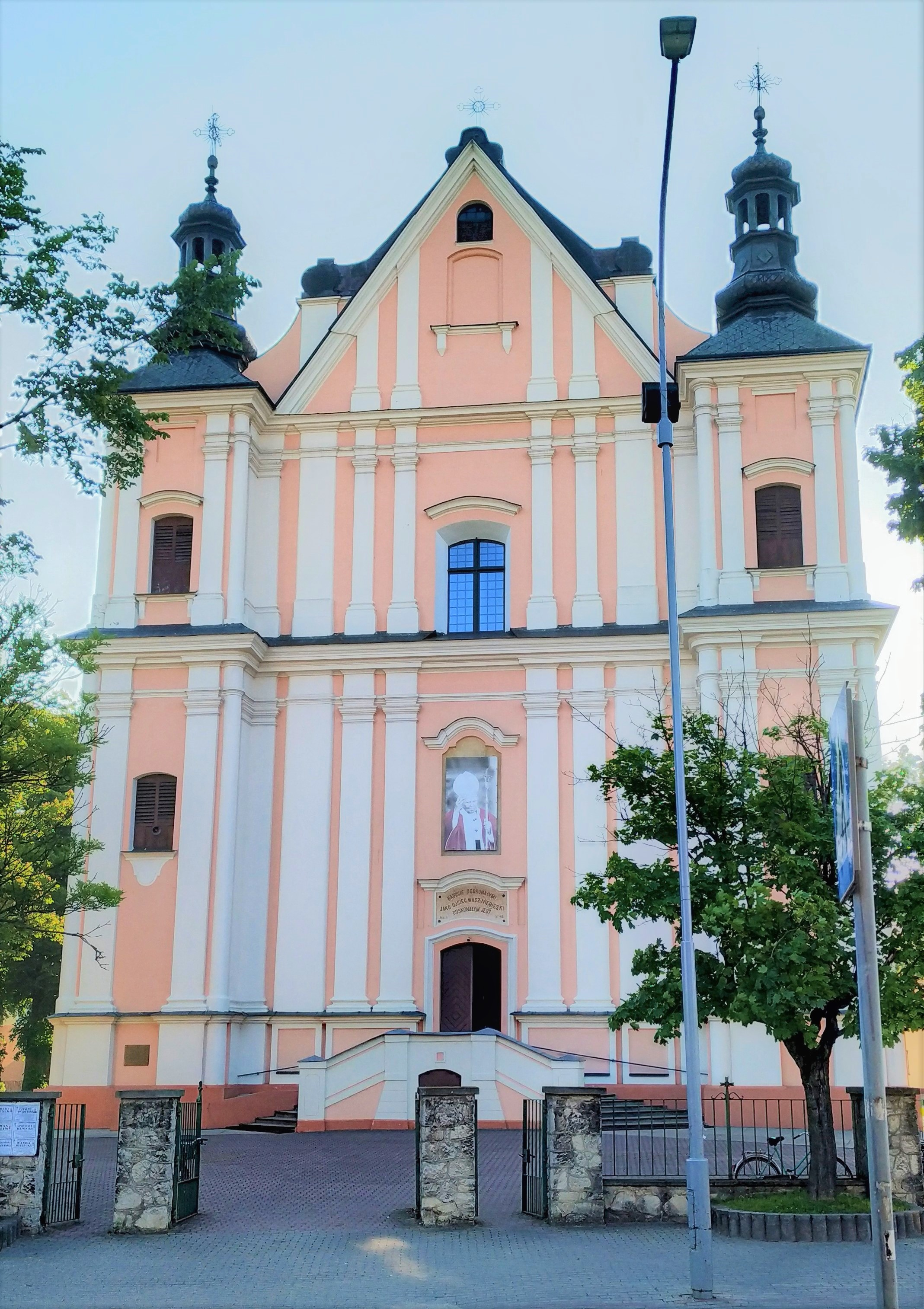
Exaltation of the Holy Cross church

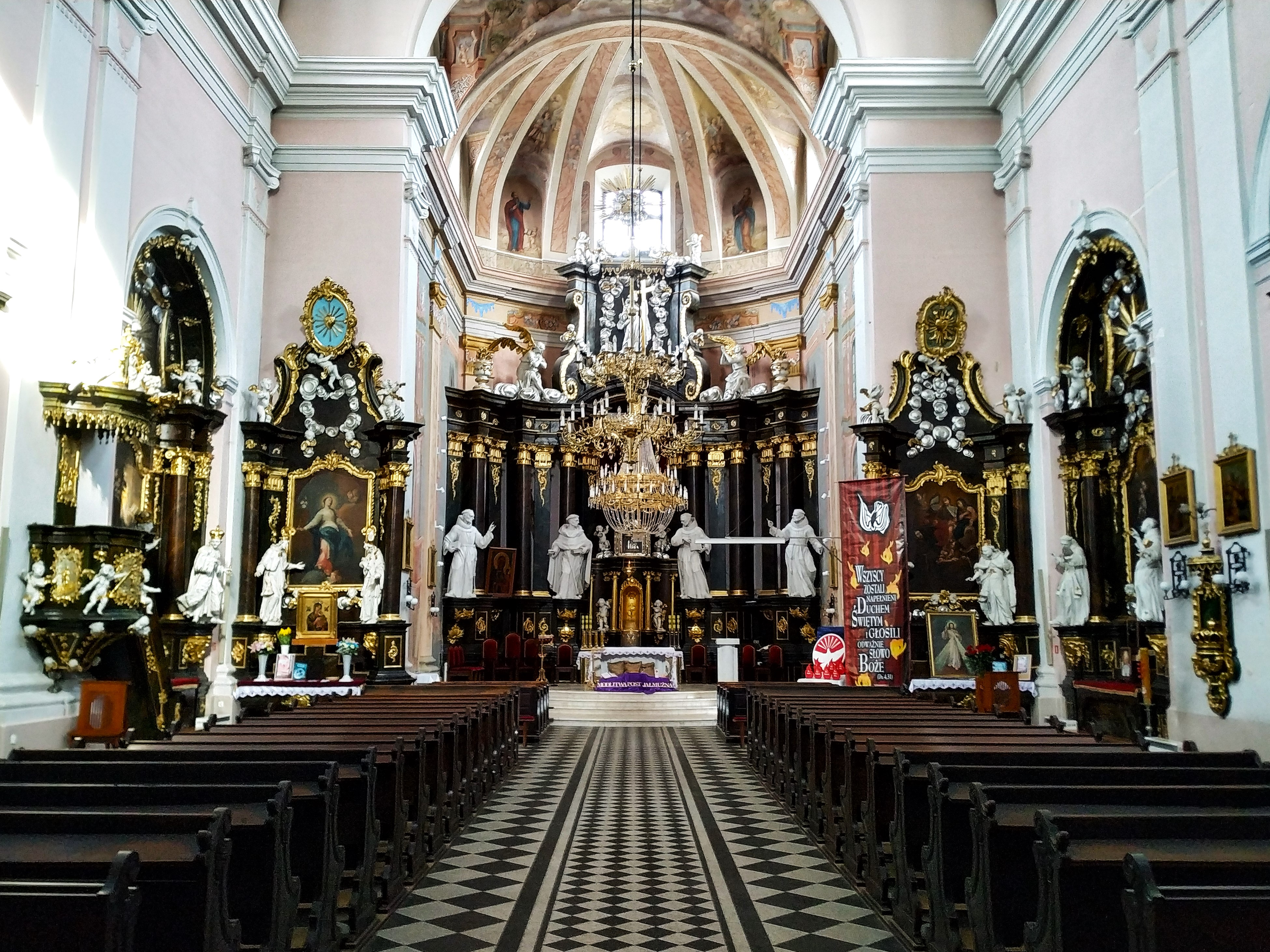
Interior of the Exaltation of the Holy Cross church

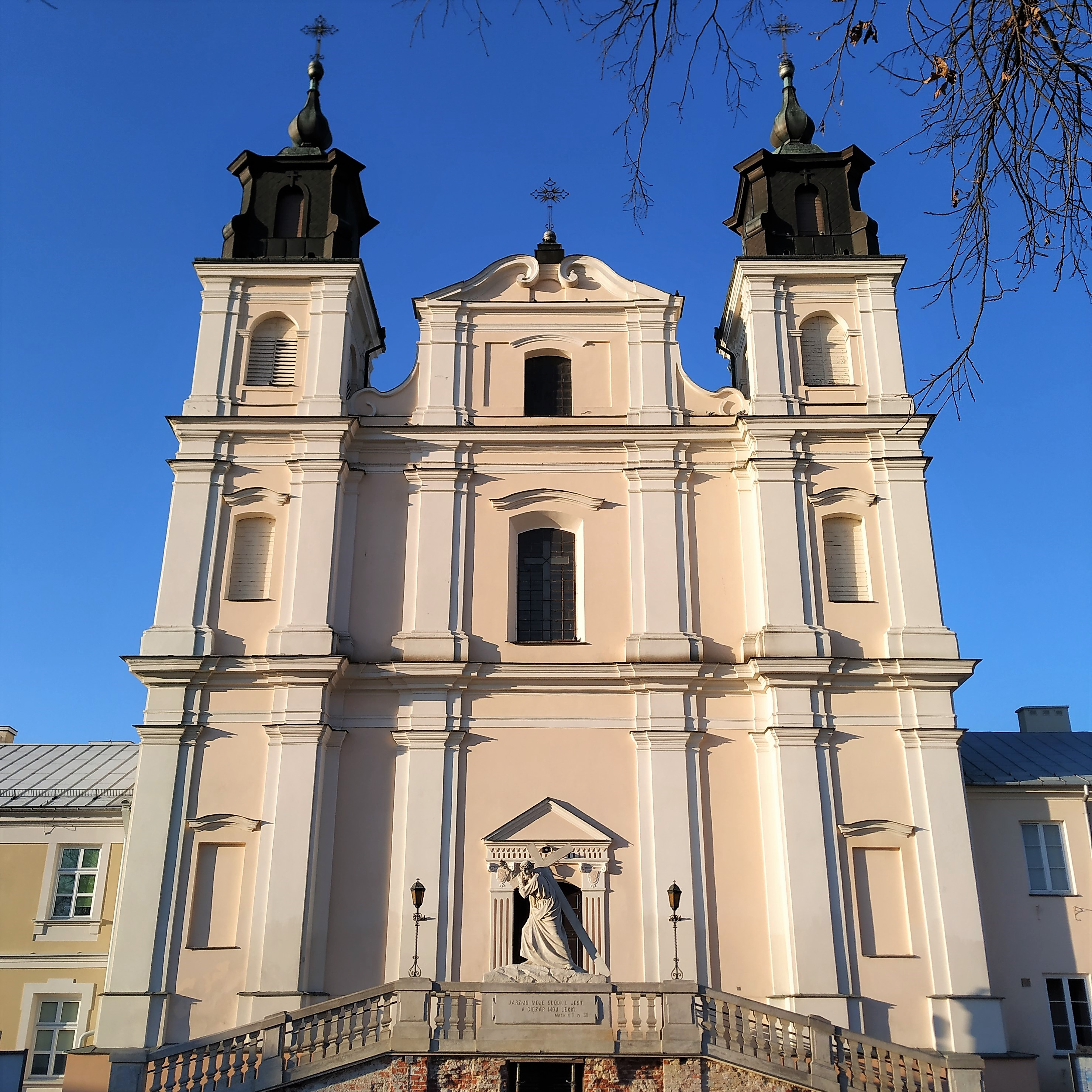
Collegiate church of Transfiguration

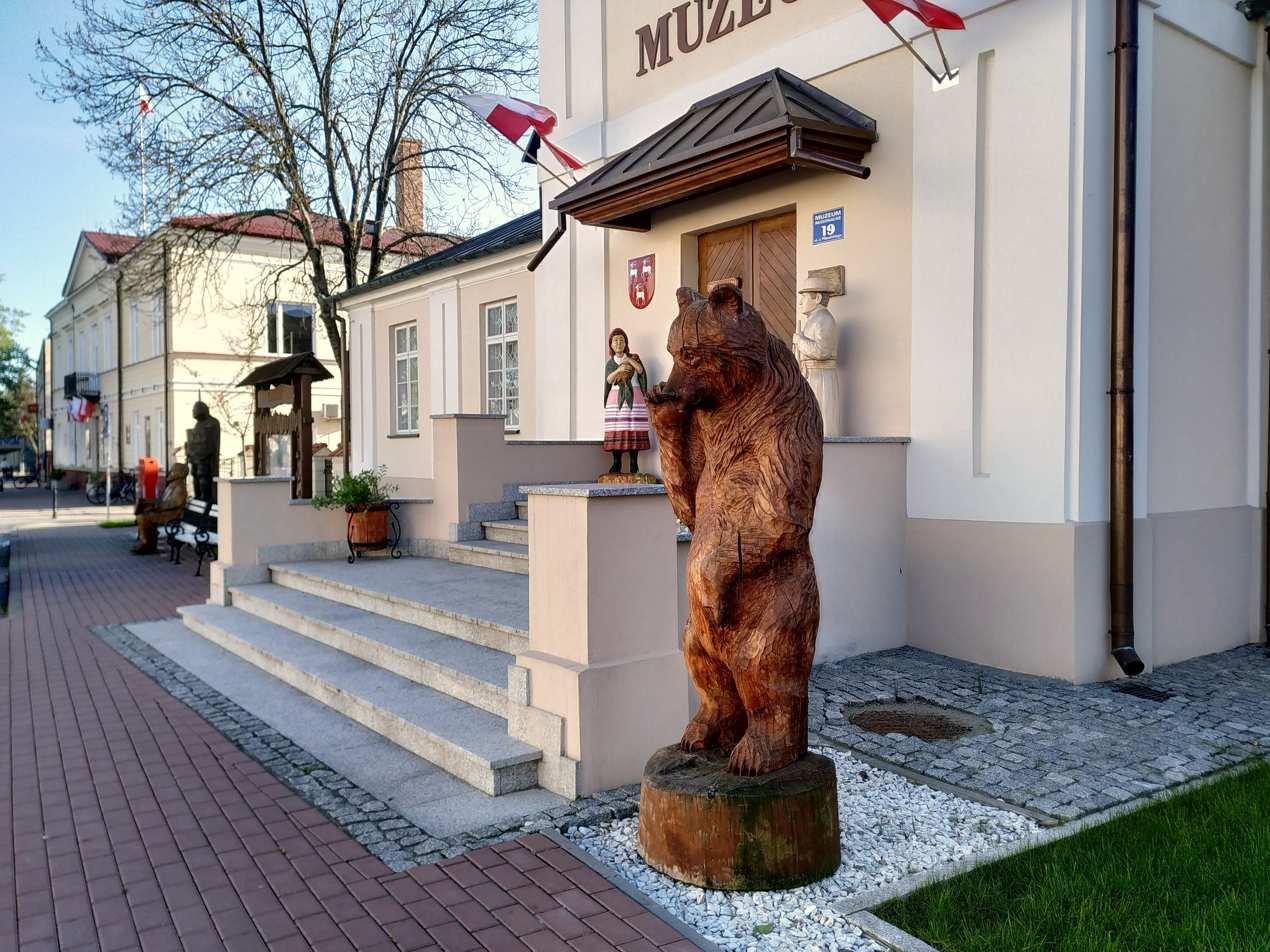
Regional Museum

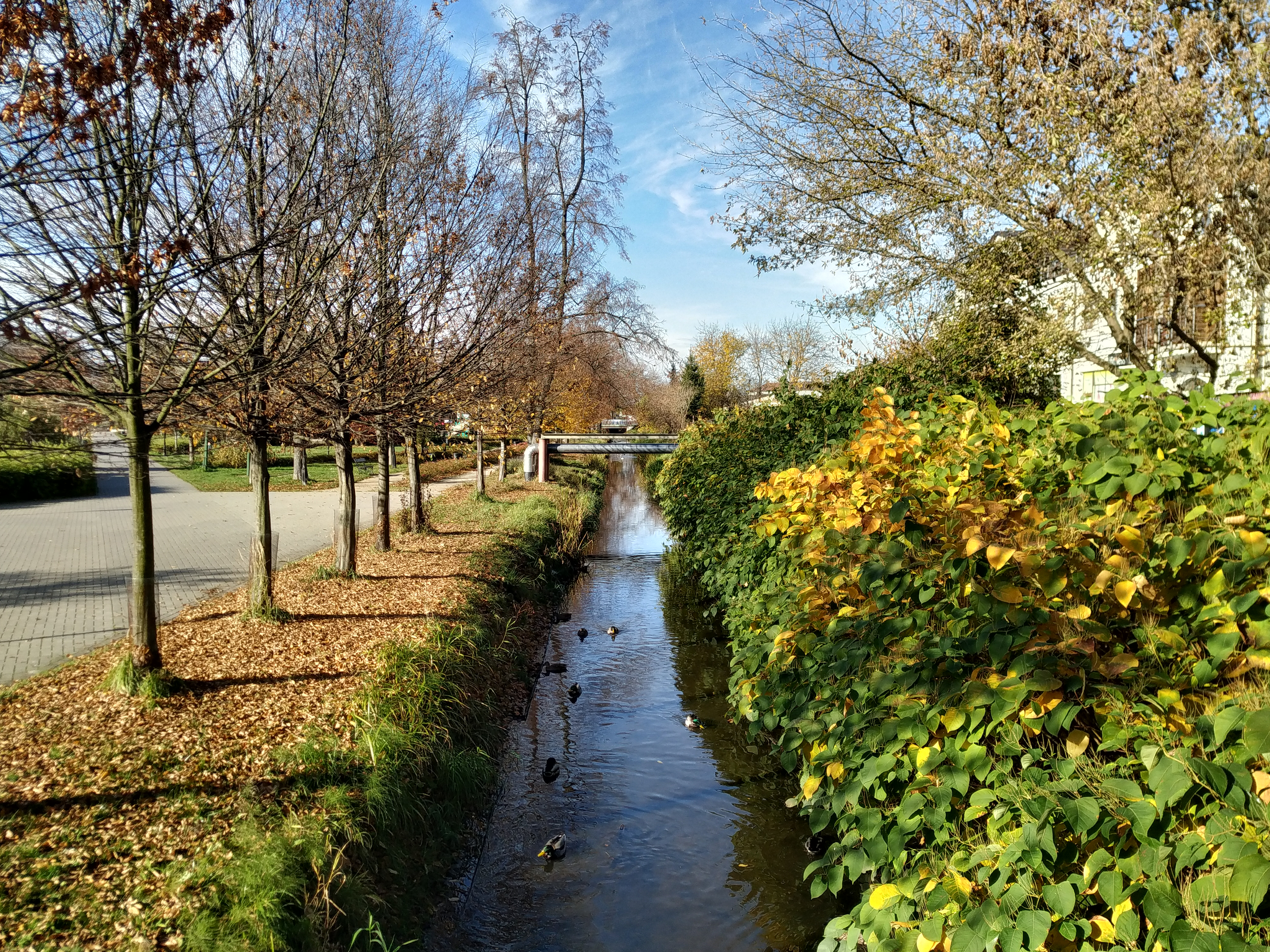
Municipal Park

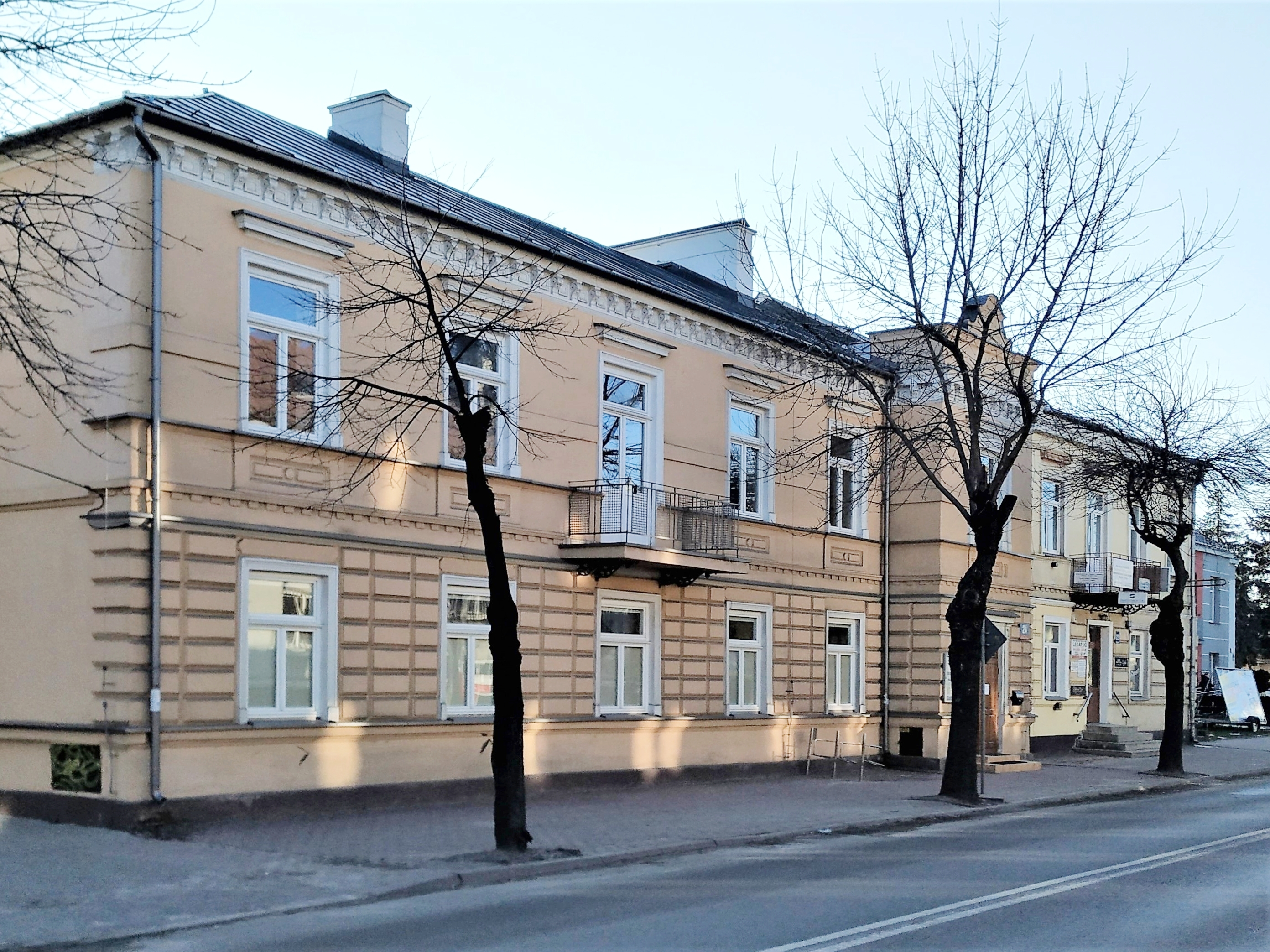
Municipal Public Library

== Transport ==
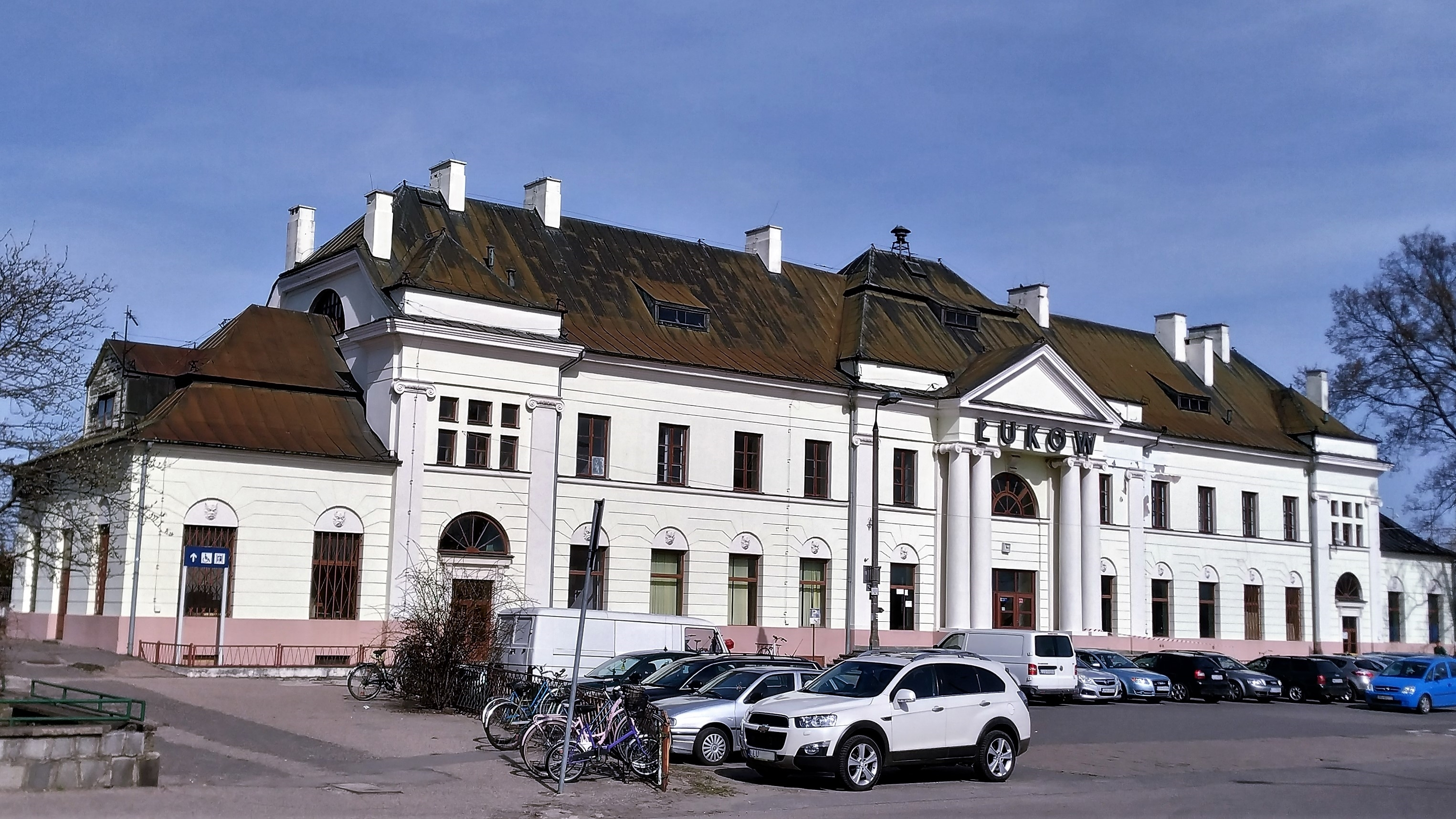
Łuków railway station

Łuków railway station is an important railroad junction, located on the strategic east–west line from Brest to Warsaw and Berlin. Other lines stemming from Łuków are the connections to Dęblin and to Skierniewice.

== Education ==
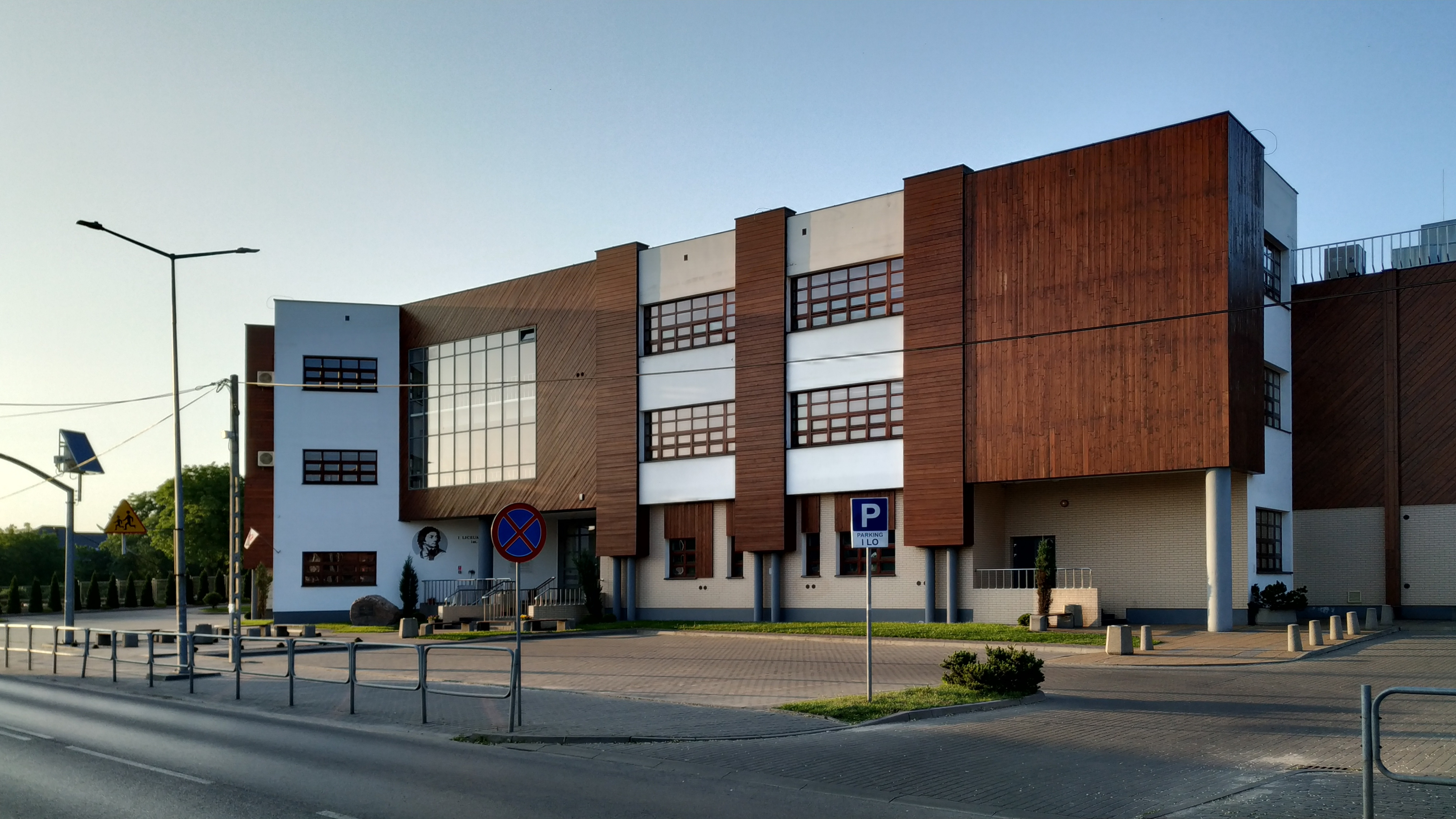
Tadeusz Kościuszko High School

- Wyższa Szkoła Biznesu i Administracji
- Medyczne Studium Zawodowe
- I Liceum Ogólnokształcące im. Tadeusza Kościuszki (Tadeusz Kościuszko High School)
- IV Liceum Ogólnokształcące im. Jana Pawła II (John Paul II High School)
- Zespół Szkół Nr 1 im. Henryka Sienkiewicza
- Zespół Szkół Nr 2 im. Aleksandra Świętochowskiego
- Zespół Szkół Nr 3 im. Władysława Stanisława Reymonta
- Language Inspiration - Angielski z Anglikami

== See also ==
- History of the Jews in Łuków
- Konstantin Petrzhak, a Soviet physicist who was born in Łuków
- Meir Dagan, an Israeli Mossad leader, who lived in Łuków until he was 5 years old
