= Anonin =

- Village
- Location within Poland
- Coordinates: 51°54′N 22°13′E
- Country: Poland
- Voivodeship: Lublin
- County: Łuków
- Gmina: Stanin

Anonin [aˈnɔnin] is a village in the administrative district of Gmina Stanin, within Łuków County, Lublin Voivodeship, in eastern Poland.
