= Kij, Lublin Voivodeship =

Kij
- Village
- Location within Poland
- Coordinates: 51°54′04″N 22°09′01″E
- Country: Poland
- Voivodeship: Lublin
- County: Łuków
- Gmina: Stanin

Kij [kii̯] is a village in the administrative district of Gmina Stanin, within Łuków County, Lublin Voivodeship, in eastern Poland.

The village belongs to the Roman Catholic parish of St. Mary Magdalene in Tuchowicz (św. Marii Magdaleny w Tuchowiczu).

In the years 1975–1998, the town was administratively part of the Siedlce Voivodeship.
