= Celiny Szlacheckie =

- Village
- Location within Poland
- Coordinates: 51°54′N 22°12′E
- Country: Poland
- Voivodeship: Lublin
- County: Łuków
- Gmina: Stanin
- Population: 190

Celiny Szlacheckie [t͡sɛˈlinɨ ʂlaˈxɛt͡skʲɛ] is a village in the administrative district of Gmina Stanin, within Łuków County, Lublin Voivodeship, in eastern Poland.
