= Zastawie =

Zastawie may refer to the following places:

- Zastawie, Kuyavian-Pomeranian Voivodeship (north-central Poland)
- Zastawie, Biłgoraj County in Lublin Voivodeship (east Poland)
- Zastawie, Krasnystaw County in Lublin Voivodeship (east Poland)
- Zastawie, Łuków County in Lublin Voivodeship (east Poland)
- Zastawie, Puławy County in Lublin Voivodeship (east Poland)
- Zastawie, Gmina Urszulin in Lublin Voivodeship (east Poland)
- Zastawie, Gmina Wola Uhruska in Lublin Voivodeship (east Poland)
- Zastawie, Masovian Voivodeship (east-central Poland)
- Zastawie, Greater Poland Voivodeship (west-central Poland)
- Zastawie, West Pomeranian Voivodeship (north-west Poland)
