= Stajki =

- Settlement
- Location within Poland
- Coordinates: 51°51′15″N 22°15′16″E
- Country: Poland
- Voivodeship: Lublin
- County: Łuków
- Gmina: Stanin

Stajki [ˈstai̯ki] is a settlement in the administrative district of Gmina Stanin, within Łuków County, Lublin Voivodeship, in eastern Poland.
