= Piaski, Łuków County =

Piaski
- Settlement
- Location within Poland
- Coordinates: 51°55′42″N 22°8′34″E
- Country: Poland
- Voivodeship: Lublin
- County: Łuków
- Gmina: Stanin

Piaski (Polish pronunciation: [ˈpjaskʲi]) is a settlement in the administrative district of Gmina Stanin, within Łuków County, Lublin Voivodeship, in eastern Poland.
