= Kosuty, Lublin Voivodeship =

Kosuty
- Village
- Location within Poland
- Coordinates: 51°53′N 22°10′E
- Country: Poland
- Voivodeship: Lublin
- County: Łuków
- Gmina: Stanin
- Population: 605

Kosuty [kɔˈsutɨ] is a village in the administrative district of Gmina Stanin, within Łuków County, Lublin Voivodeship, in eastern Poland.
