= Kopina, Łuków County =

Kopina
- Village
- Location within Poland
- Coordinates: 51°53′24″N 22°7′30″E
- Country: Poland
- Voivodeship: Lublin
- County: Łuków
- Gmina: Stanin

Kopina [kɔˈpina] is a village in the administrative district of Gmina Stanin, within Łuków County, Lublin Voivodeship, in eastern Poland.
