= Próchnica, Lublin Voivodeship =

Próchnica
- Settlement
- Location within Poland
- Coordinates: 51°53′54″N 22°13′36″E
- Country: Poland
- Voivodeship: Lublin
- County: Łuków
- Gmina: Stanin

Próchnica [pruxˈnit͡sa] is a settlement in the administrative district of Gmina Stanin, within Łuków County, Lublin Voivodeship, in eastern Poland.
