= Gózd, Łuków County =

Gózd
- Village
- Location within Poland
- Coordinates: 51°54′46″N 22°09′16″E
- Country: Poland
- Voivodeship: Lublin
- County: Łuków
- Gmina: Stanin

Gózd [ɡust] is a village in the administrative district of Gmina Stanin, within Łuków County, Lublin Voivodeship, in eastern Poland.
