= Aleksandrów, Gmina Stanin =

Aleksandrów
- Village
- Location within Poland
- Coordinates: 51°53′38″N 22°3′43″E
- Country: Poland
- Voivodeship: Lublin
- County: Łuków
- Gmina: Stanin

Aleksandrów [alɛkˈsandruf] is a village in the administrative district of Gmina Stanin, within Łuków County, Lublin Voivodeship, in eastern Poland.
