= Zawodzie (disambiguation) =

Zawodzie is a district of Katowice, Poland.

Zawodzie may also refer to the following places in Poland:

- Zawodzie, Piotrków County in Łódź Voivodeship (central Poland)
- Zawodzie, Radomsko County in Łódź Voivodeship (central Poland)
- Zawodzie, Lublin Voivodeship (east Poland)
- Zawodzie, Silesian Voivodeship (south Poland)
