= Wnętrzne, Lublin Voivodeship =

Wnętrzne
- Village
- Location within Poland
- Coordinates: 51°53′20″N 22°4′3″E
- Country: Poland
- Voivodeship: Lublin
- County: Łuków
- Gmina: Stanin
- Population: 278

Wnętrzne [ˈvnɛntʂnɛ] is a village in the administrative district of Gmina Stanin, within Łuków County, Lublin Voivodeship, in eastern Poland.
