= Kierzków =

Kierzków may refer to the following places in Poland

- Kierzków, Lublin Voivodeship
- Kierzków, West Pomeranian Voivodeship
