= Gmina Stanin =

Gmina Stanin Stanin Commune
- Gmina
- Flag Coat of arms
- Interactive map of Gmina Stanin
- Coordinates (Stanin): 51°52′N 22°12′E
- Country: Poland
- Voivodeship: Lublin
- County: Łuków
- Seat: Stanin

Area
  - Total: 160.25 km^{2} (61.87 sq mi)

Population (2006)
  - Total: 9,789
  - Density: 61.09/km^{2} (158.2/sq mi)
- Website: http://www.stanin.pl

Gmina Stanin is a rural gmina (administrative district) in Łuków County, Lublin Voivodeship, in eastern Poland. Its seat is the village of Stanin, which lies approximately 14 kilometres (9 mi) south-west of Łuków and 74 km (46 mi) north of the regional capital Lublin.

The gmina covers an area of 160.25 square kilometres (61.9 sq mi), and as of 2006 its total population is 9,789.

== Villages ==
Gmina Stanin contains the villages and settlements of Aleksandrów, Anonin, Borowina, Celiny Szlacheckie, Celiny Włościańskie, Gózd, Jarczówek, Jeleniec, Jonnik, Józefów, Kierzków, Kij, Kopina, Kosuty, Lipniak, Niedźwiadka, Nowa Wróblina, Nowy Stanin, Ogniwo, Piaski, Próchnica, Sarnów, Stajki, Stanin, Stara Gąska, Stara Wróblina, Tuchowicz, Wesołówka, Wnętrzne, Wólka Zastawska, Zagoździe, Zastawie and Zawodzie.

== Neighbouring gminas ==
Gmina Stanin is bordered by the gminas of Krzywda, Łuków, Stoczek Łukowski, Wojcieszków and Wola Mysłowska.
