= Nowa Wróblina =

- Village
- Location within Poland
- Coordinates: 51°50′N 22°12′E
- Country: Poland
- Voivodeship: Lublin
- County: Łuków
- Gmina: Stanin

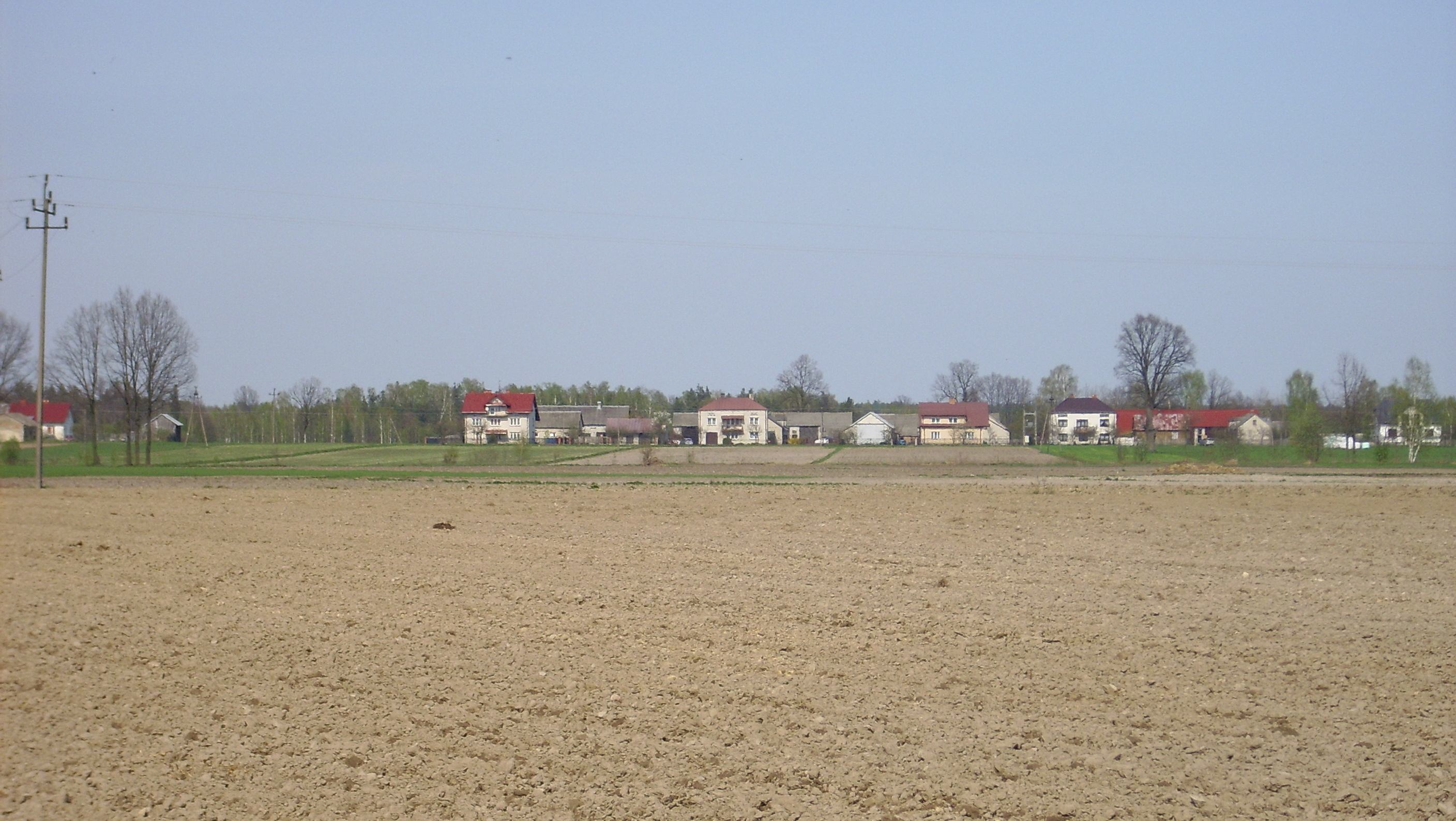

Nowa Wróblina [ˈnɔva vruˈblina] is a village in the administrative district of Gmina Stanin, within Łuków County, Lublin Voivodeship, in eastern Poland.
