= Jonnik =

- Village
- Location within Poland
- Coordinates: 51°50′40″N 22°14′5″E
- Country: Poland
- Voivodeship: Lublin
- County: Łuków
- Gmina: Stanin

Jonnik [ˈjɔnnik] is a village in the administrative district of Gmina Stanin, within Łuków County, Lublin Voivodeship, in eastern Poland.
