= Stara Gąska =

- Village
- Location within Poland
- Coordinates: 51°49′47″N 22°13′48″E
- Country: Poland
- Voivodeship: Lublin
- County: Łuków
- Gmina: Stanin
- Population: 120

Stara Gąska (pronounced [ˈstara ˈɡɔ̃ska]) is a village in the administrative district of Gmina Stanin, within Łuków County, Lublin Voivodeship, in eastern Poland.
