= Zagoździe =

- Village
- Location within Poland
- Coordinates: 51°55′N 22°7′E
- Country: Poland
- Voivodeship: Lublin
- County: Łuków
- Gmina: Stanin
- Population: 300

Zagoździe [zaˈɡɔʑd͡ʑɛ] is a village in the administrative district of Gmina Stanin, within Łuków County, Lublin Voivodeship, in eastern Poland.
