= Celiny Włościańskie =

- Village
- Location within Poland
- Coordinates: 51°54′59″N 22°12′04″E
- Country: Poland
- Voivodeship: Lublin
- County: Łuków
- Gmina: Stanin

Celiny Włościańskie (Polish pronunciation: [tsɛˈlinɨ vwɔɕˈtɕaj̃skʲɛ]) is a village in the administrative district of Gmina Stanin, within Łuków County, Lublin Voivodeship, in eastern Poland.
