= Jeleniec, Lublin Voivodeship =

Jeleniec
- Village
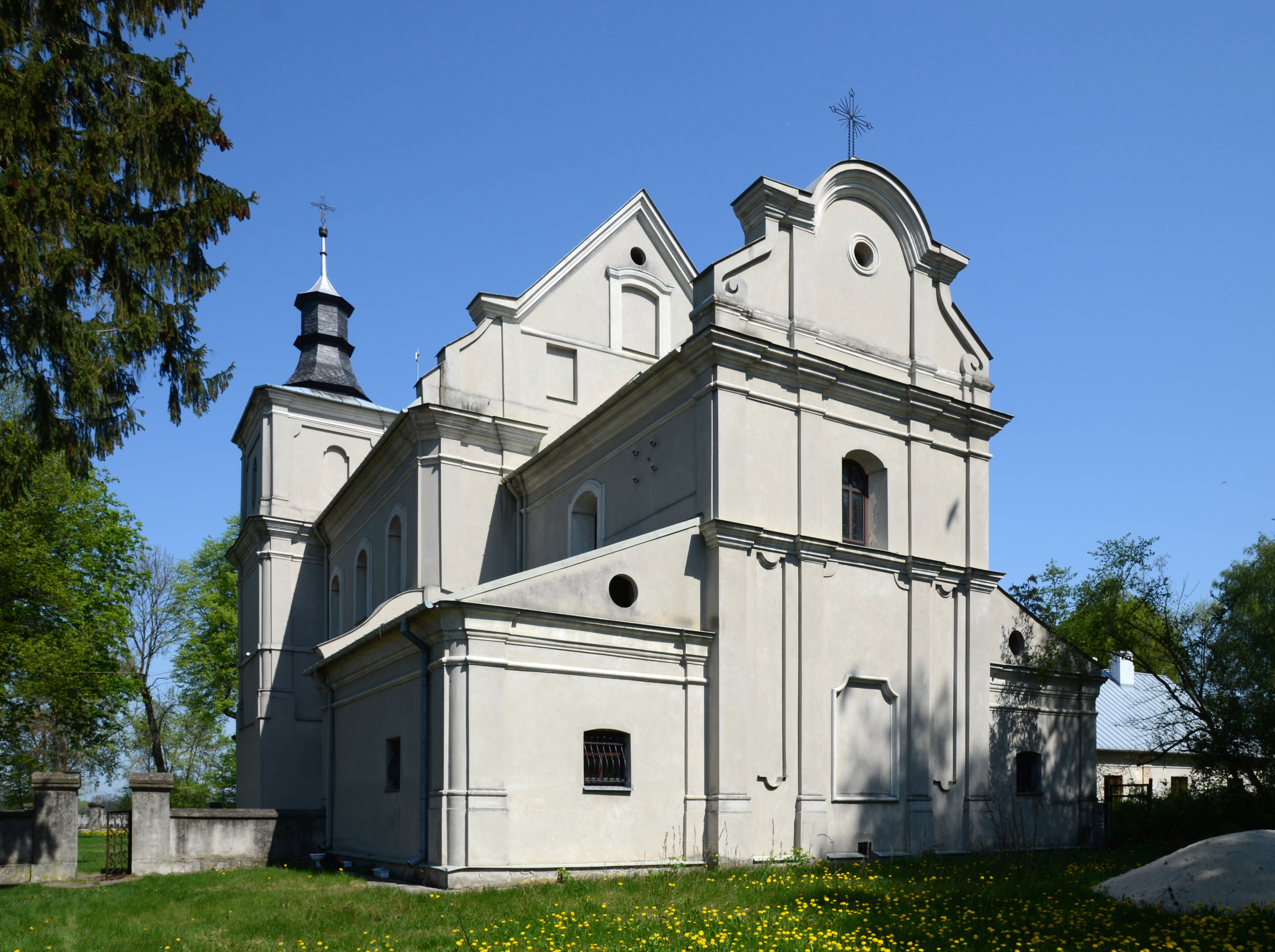
- Saint Anne Church

- Location within Poland
- Coordinates: 51°52′N 22°16′E
- Country: Poland
- Voivodeship: Lublin
- County: Łuków
- Gmina: Stanin
- Population: 595

Jeleniec [jɛˈlɛɲɛt͡s] is a village in the administrative district of Gmina Stanin, within Łuków County, Lublin Voivodeship, in eastern Poland.
