= Zastawie, Łuków County =

Zastawie
- Village
- Location within Poland
- Coordinates: 51°56′N 22°10′E
- Country: Poland
- Voivodeship: Lublin
- County: Łuków
- Gmina: Stanin
- Website: www.zastawie.za.pl

Zastawie [zasˈtavjɛ] is a village in the administrative district of Gmina Stanin, within Łuków County, Lublin Voivodeship, in eastern Poland.
