= Borowina, Łuków County =

Borowina
- Village
- Location within Poland
- Coordinates: 51°49′48″N 22°16′34″E
- Country: Poland
- Voivodeship: Lublin
- County: Łuków
- Gmina: Stanin
- Population: 175

Borowina [bɔrɔˈvina] is a village in the administrative district of Gmina Stanin, within Łuków County, Lublin Voivodeship, in eastern Poland.
