= Zawodzie, Lublin Voivodeship =

Zawodzie
- Settlement
- Location within Poland
- Coordinates: 51°52′26″N 22°14′55″E
- Country: Poland
- Voivodeship: Lublin
- County: Łuków
- Gmina: Stanin

Zawodzie [zaˈvɔd͡ʑɛ] is a settlement in the administrative district of Gmina Stanin, within Łuków County, Lublin Voivodeship, in eastern Poland.
