= Stanin =

- Village
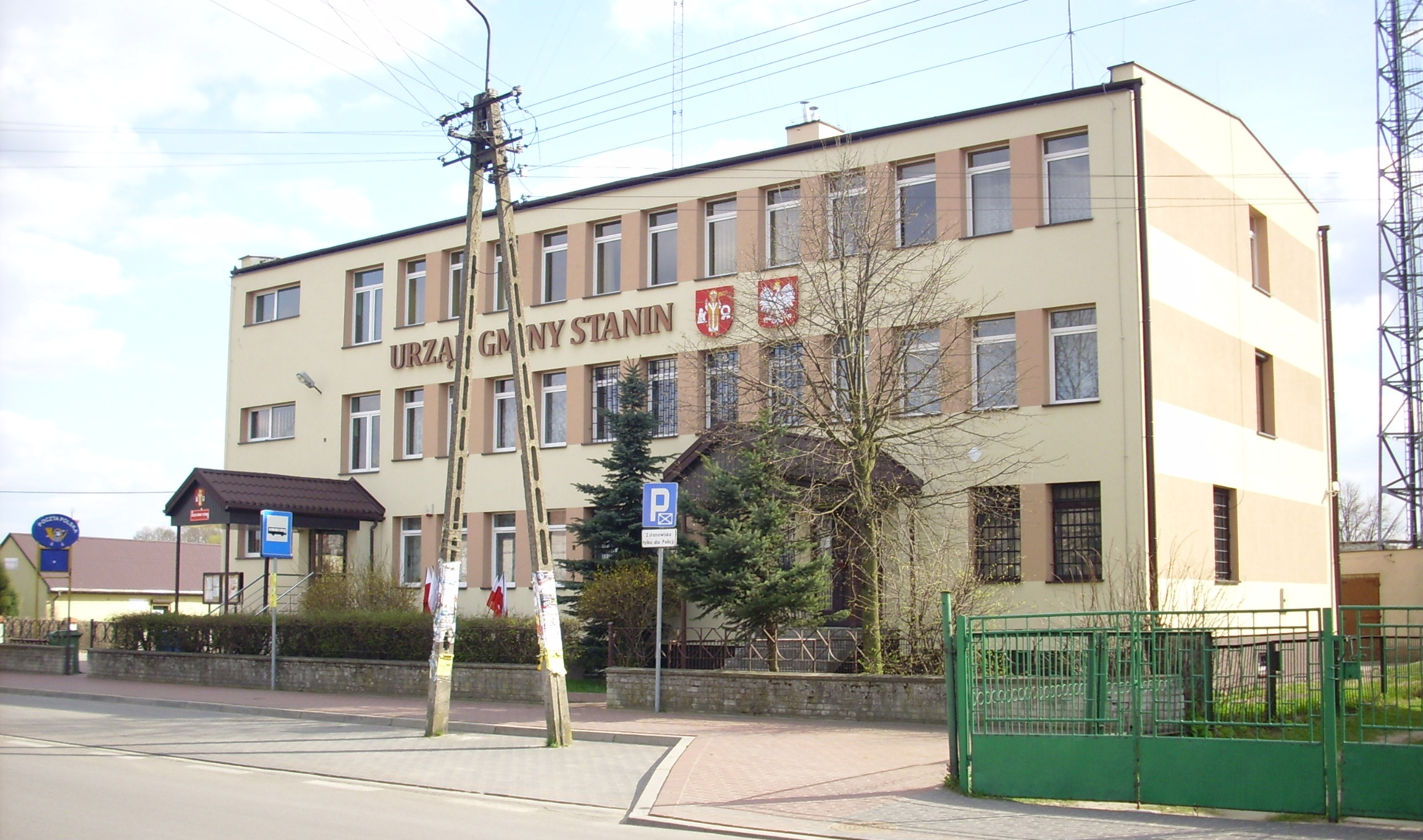
- Gmina Stanin administration building

- Location within Poland
- Coordinates: 51°51′44″N 22°12′35″E
- Country: Poland
- Voivodeship: Lublin
- County: Łuków
- Gmina: Stanin

Stanin [ˈstanin] is a village in Łuków County, Lublin Voivodeship, in eastern Poland. It is the seat of the gmina (administrative district) called Gmina Stanin.
