= Wojcieszków =

- Village
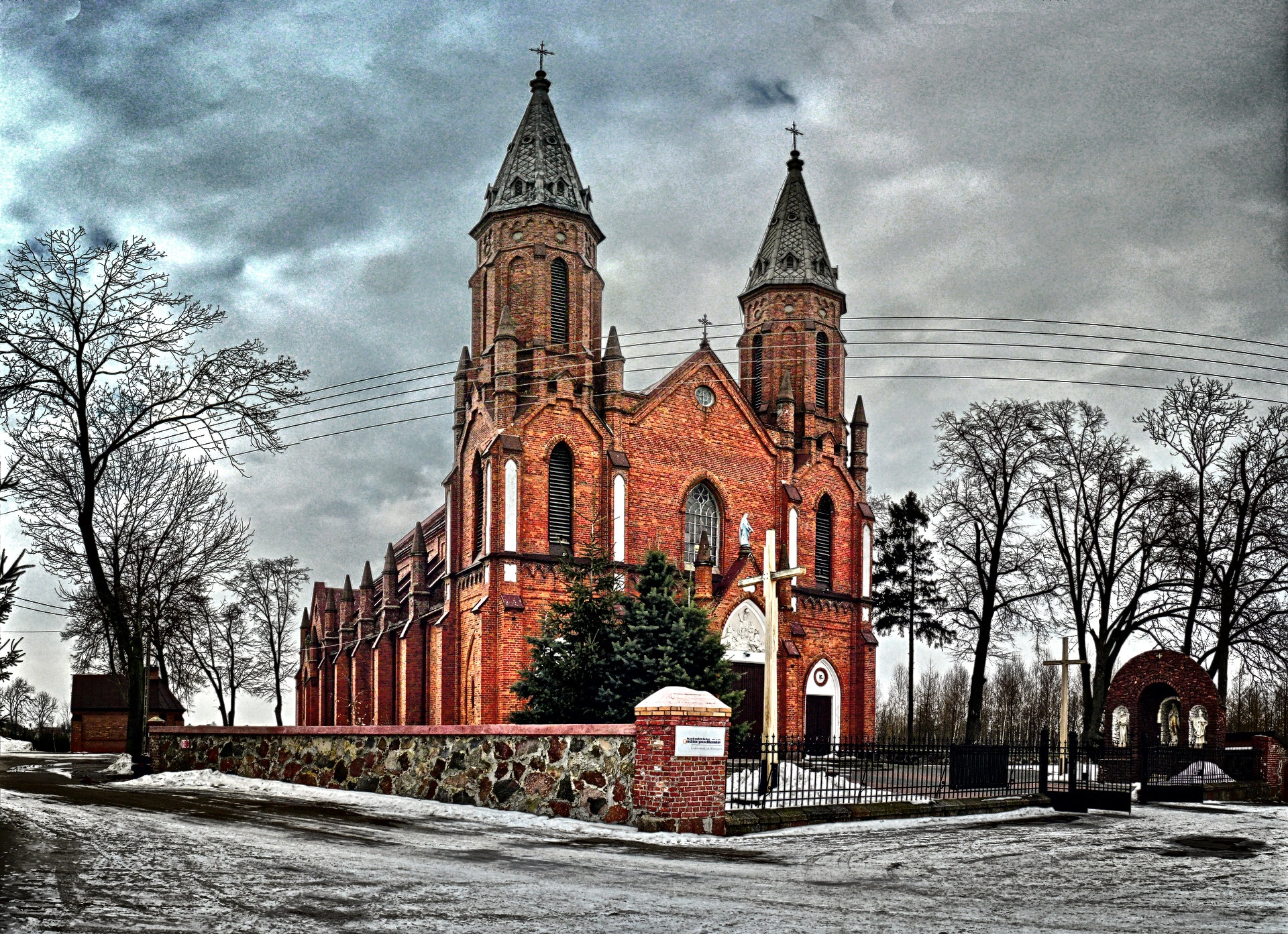
- Church of the Sacred Heart

- Location within Poland
- Coordinates: 51°46′N 22°19′E
- Country: Poland
- Voivodeship: Lublin
- County: Łuków
- Gmina: Wojcieszków

Population
  - Total: 1,100

Wojcieszków (Polish pronunciation: [vɔjˈt͡ɕɛʂkuf]) is a village in Łuków County, Lublin Voivodeship, in eastern Poland. It is the seat of the gmina (administrative district) called Gmina Wojcieszków.

== History ==
Ancient Roman coins, including denarii of emperors Hadrian and Marcus Aurelius, have been found in Wojcieszków before 1912.

The village of Wojcieszków was founded in 1437 by a local nobleman Klemens Bieliński. In the same year, Bishop of Kraków Zbigniew Olesnicki established a Roman Catholic parish church here. On January 21, 1540, upon request of Mikołaj Dzik, the owner of Wojcieszkow, King Sigismund I Old granted Magdeburg town rights.

In 1767, a wooden church of Holy Trinity was built, and in 1771, a Suchodolski family library was opened. Until the Partitions of Poland, Wojcieszkow belonged to the Stężyca County, Sandomierz Voivodeship, Lesser Poland Province.

In the late 18th century, the Plater family built a large manor house, which was burned during World War II. According to documents, in 1802 Wojcieszków had a marketplace, a church, and a castle. The town, however, was on poor soil, among forests and sands, which had a negative impact on its development. As a result, Wojcieszków gradually declined and, in 1819, was stripped of its town charter.

== Today ==
The location of Wojcieszków turned out to be an advantage. Owing to its clean environment, hilly landscape and forests, the village is emerging as a local tourist center. It has a historic church and a cemetery, where Maria Babska, the wife of Henryk Sienkiewicz, is buried.
