= Trzebieszów, Lublin Voivodeship =

Trzebieszów
- Village
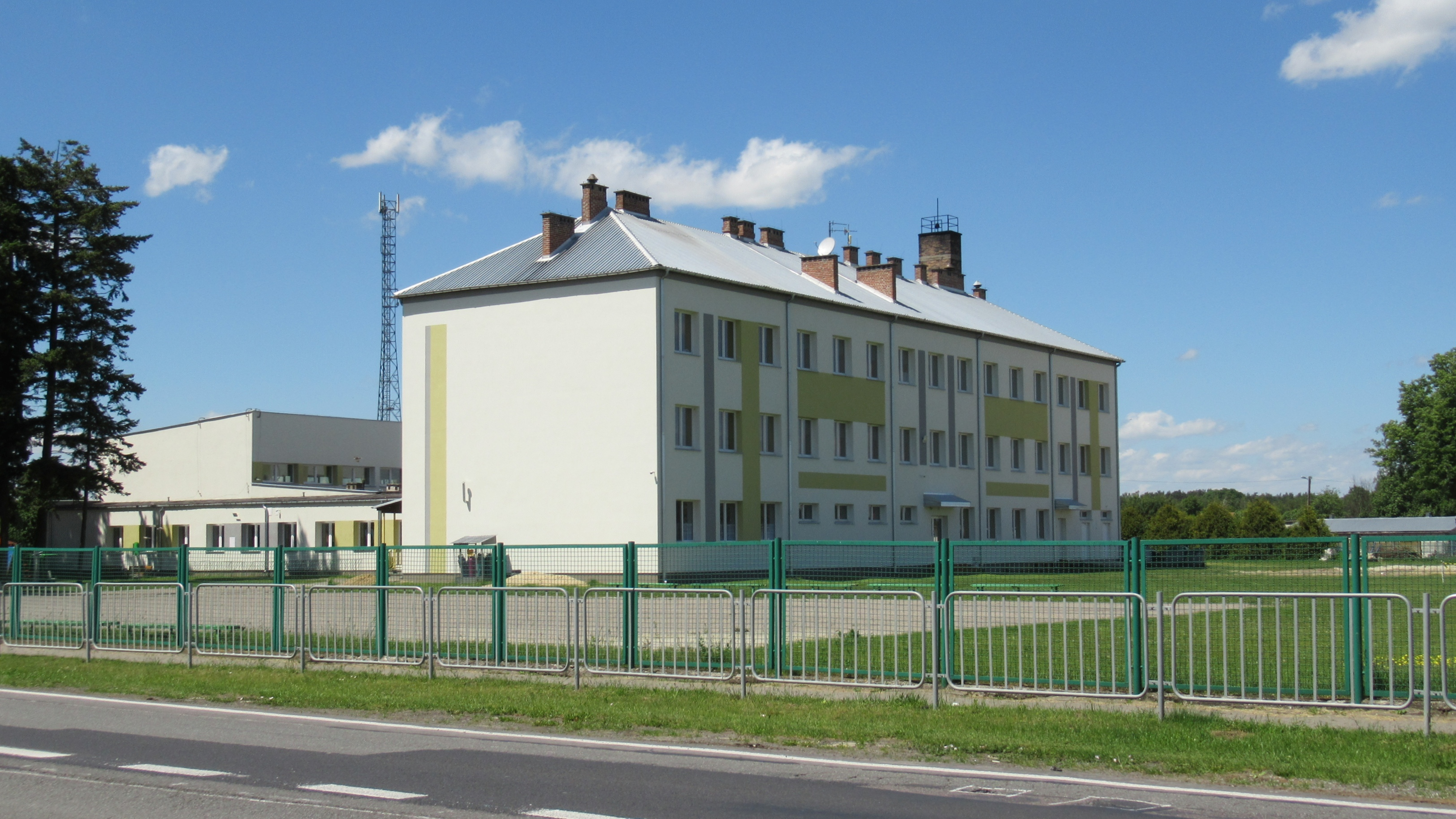
- Elementary school

- Location within Poland
- Coordinates: 51°59′N 22°33′E
- Country: Poland
- Voivodeship: Lublin
- County: Łuków
- Gmina: Trzebieszów

Population
  - Total: 1,320

Trzebieszów [tʂɛˈbjɛʂuf] is a village in Łuków County, Lublin Voivodeship, in eastern Poland. It is the seat of the gmina (administrative district) called Gmina Trzebieszów.
