= Tuchowicz =

- Village
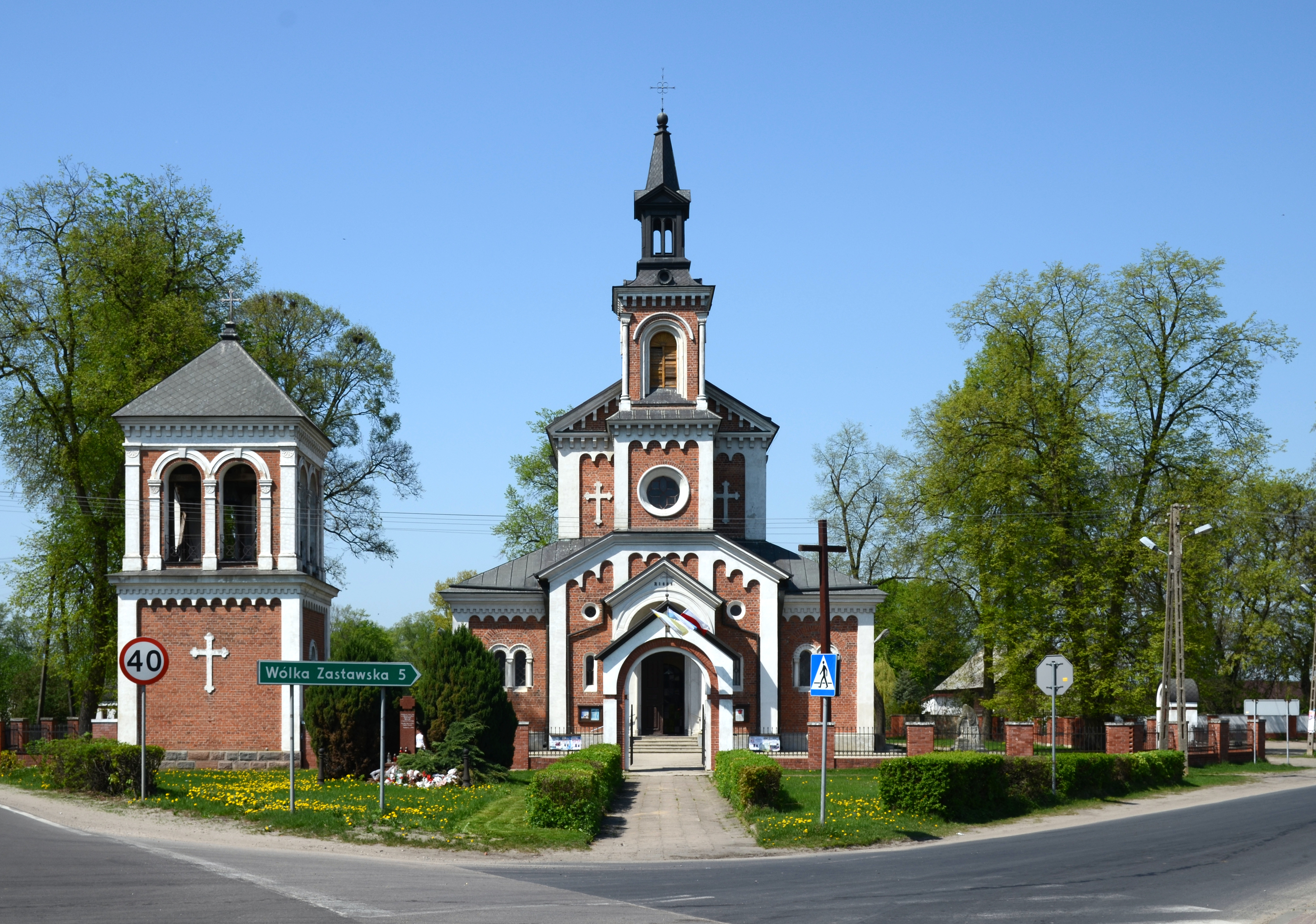
- Church of Saint Mary Magdalene

- Location within Poland
- Coordinates: 51°53′N 22°14′E
- Country: Poland
- Voivodeship: Lublin
- County: Łuków
- Gmina: Stanin

Population (approx.)
  - Total: 450
- Time zone: UTC+1 (CET)
  - Summer (DST): UTC+2 (CEST)
- Vehicle registration: LLU

Tuchowicz [tuˈxɔvit͡ʂ] is a village in the administrative district of Gmina Stanin, within Łuków County, Lublin Voivodeship, in eastern Poland.

== History ==
The village was first mentioned in 1350 as Tanczcovicz. In 1430, its name was spelled Thuchowicz, and in 1470 - Thuchowyecz. Its name probably comes from Slavic first name Tuchowit. Within the Kingdom of Poland, it was administratively located in the Łuków Land, Lublin Voivodeship, Lesser Poland Province

On 26 June 1430, King Władyslaw Jagiełło granted Magdeburg rights, allowing for two fairs (July 22 and October 16). Tuchowicz remained a small town. It lost its charter in 1821. In the 19th century, this former town belonged to the Hempel family, which controlled it until 1945. From 1815 until 1916, Tuchowicz was part of Russian-controlled Congress Poland (see Partitions of Poland).
