= Łuków County =

Łuków County Powiat łukowski
- County
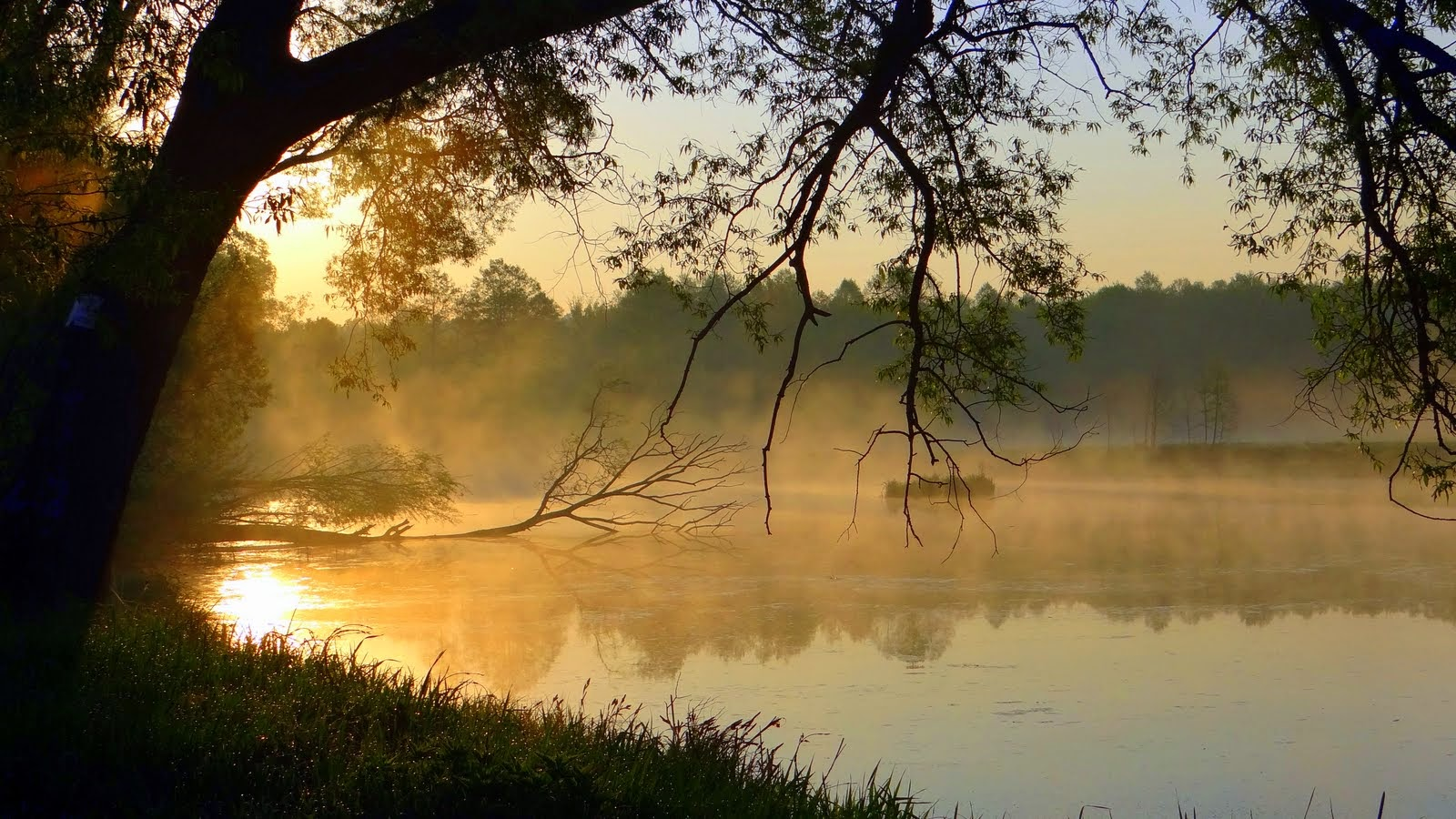
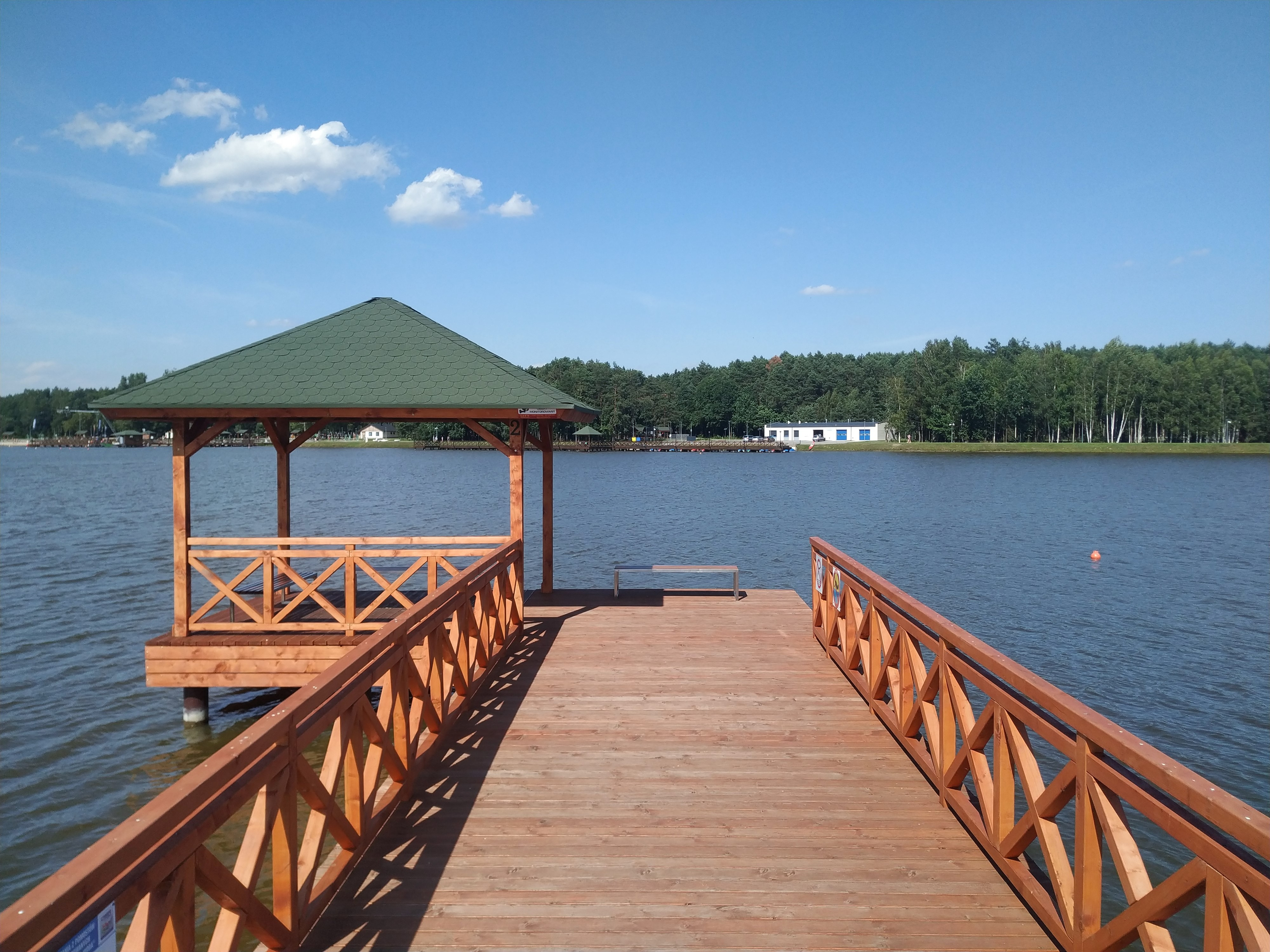
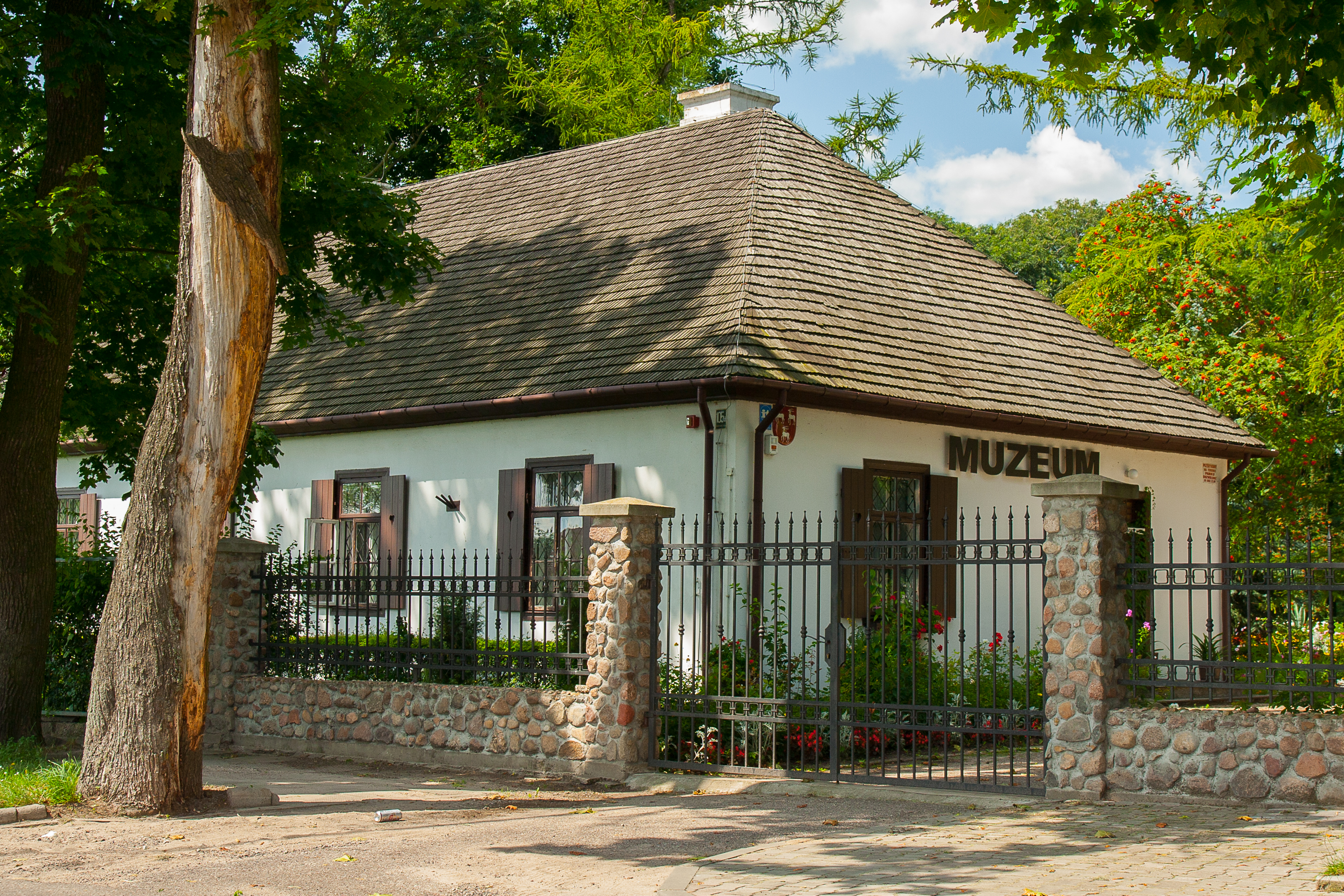
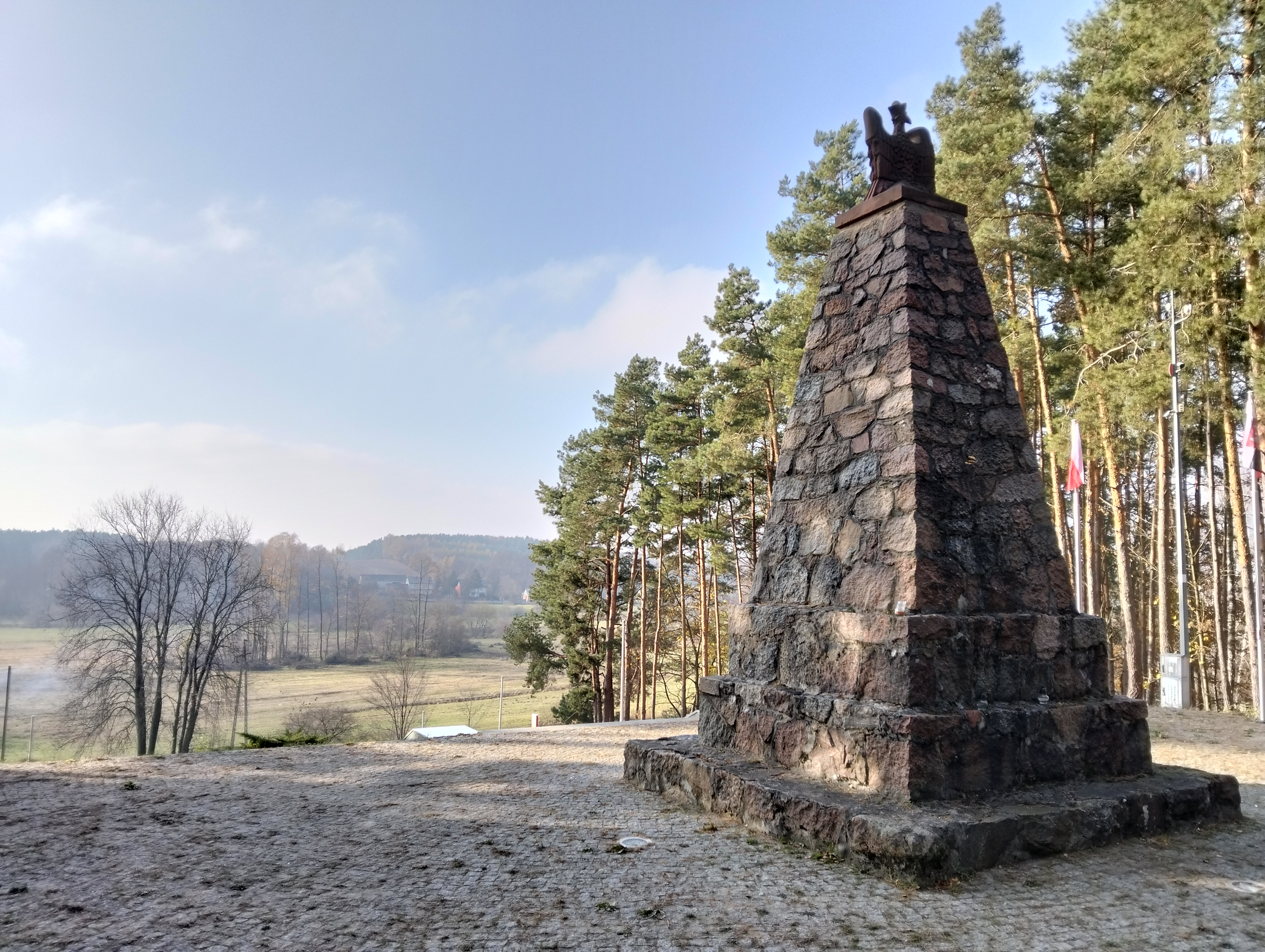
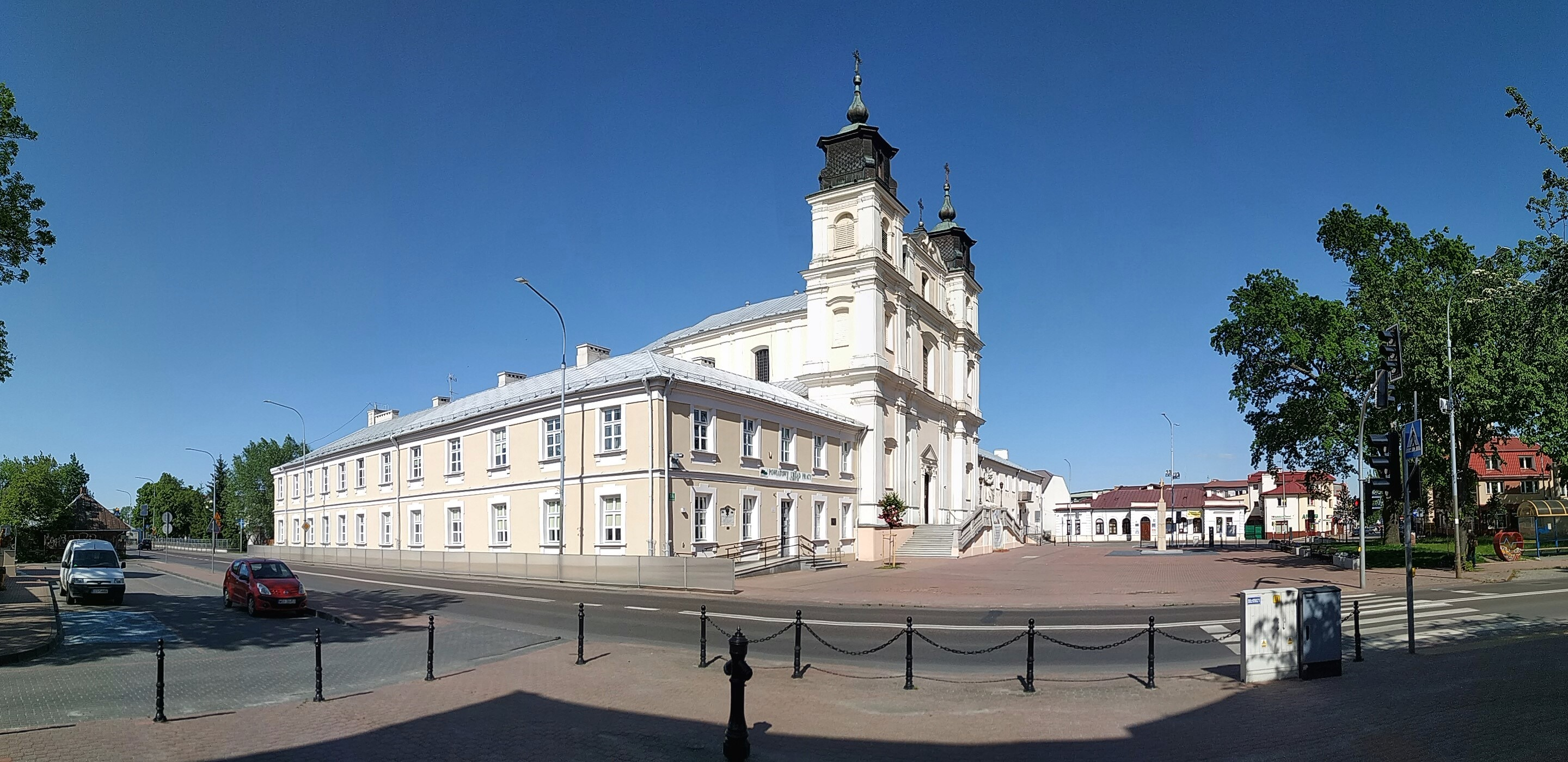
- Pond in Wólka Poznańska Zimna Woda Reservoir Sienkiewicz Museum in Wola Okrzejska Battle of Stoczek memorial Collegiate Church of Transfiguration in Łuków

- Flag Coat of arms

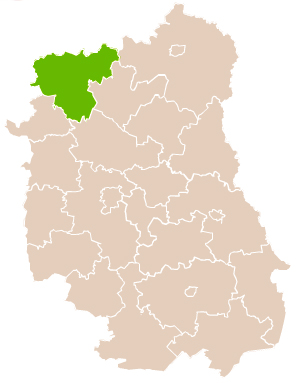
- Location within the voivodeship
- Coordinates (Łuków): 51°55′N 22°23′E
- Country: Poland
- Voivodeship: Lublin
- Seat: Łuków
- Gminas: Total 11 (incl. 2 urban): Łuków; Stoczek Łukowski; Gmina Adamów; Gmina Krzywda; Gmina Łuków; Gmina Serokomla; Gmina Stanin; Gmina Stoczek Łukowski; Gmina Trzebieszów; Gmina Wojcieszków; Gmina Wola Mysłowska

Area
  - Total: 1,394.09 km^{2} (538.26 sq mi)

Population (2019)
  - Total: 107,144
  - Density: 76.8559/km^{2} (199.056/sq mi)
  - Urban: 32,405
  - Rural: 74,739
- Time zone: UTC+1 (CET)
  - Summer (DST): UTC+2 (CEST)
- Car plates: LLU
- Website: www.starostwolukow.pl

Łuków County (Polish: powiat łukowski) is a unit of territorial administration and local government (powiat) in Lublin Voivodeship, eastern Poland. It was established on January 1, 1999, as a result of the Polish local government reforms passed in 1998. Its administrative seat and largest town is Łuków, which lies 76 kilometres (47 mi) north of the regional capital Lublin. The only other town in the county is Stoczek Łukowski, lying 30 km (19 mi) west of Łuków.

The county covers an area of 1,394.09 square kilometres (538.3 sq mi). As of 2019, its total population is 107,144, including 29,885, in Łuków, 2,520 in Stoczek Łukowski, and a rural population of 74,739.

== Łuków County in the past ==
Łuków Land (Polish: ziemia łukowska, Latin: Terra Lucoviensis, Districtus Lucoviensis) or Łuków County was an administrative unit (ziemia) of both the Kingdom of Poland and the Polish–Lithuanian Commonwealth. With seat in the town of Lukow, it was located in extreme northeastern corner of Lesser Poland, and until 1474 belonged to Sandomierz Voivodeship. From 1474 to 1795, Łuków Land was part of Lublin Voivodeship. Its total area was 1,928 km^{2} (744 sq mi).

Łuków Land bordered Lesser Polands’ Lublin County in the south, Lesser Polands’ Stężyca Land in the southwest, Mazovian Czersk Land in the west, Mazovian Liw Land in northwest, Drohiczyn Land (part of Podlasie) in the north and Brześć Litewski County (part of Grand Duchy of Lithuania) in the east.

In early years of Polish statehood, Łuków Land belonged to the Province (Land) of Sandomierz, which later became Sandomierz Voivodeship. In 1474, when Lublin Voivodeship was carved out of Sandomierz Voivodeship, Łuków Land became part of this new administrative unit.

Historic town of Łuków was the capital of the land, and the seat of the starosta. Currently, there are only four towns in the territory of this former administrative unit. Apart from Łuków, these are Siedlce, Radzyń Podlaski and Kock. Also, the villages of Serokomla, Tuchowicz and Zbuczyn had town status.

After the Third Partition of Poland, Łuków Land was annexed by the Habsburg Empire as part of New Galicia (1795). After the Polish victory in the Austro-Polish War of 1809, it became part of the short-lived Duchy of Warsaw, and after the duchy's dissolution in 1815, it was part of Russian-controlled Congress Poland. Due to numerous administrative changes in this corner of historic Lesser Poland lost its ties with the rest of the province, and in the 19th century became called Southern Podlasie. In the Second Polish Republic, former Łuków Land belonged to Lublin Voivodeship. Currently, it is divided between Lublin Voivodeship (Łuków) and Mazovian Voivodeship (Siedlce).

== Neighbouring counties ==
Łuków County is bordered by Siedlce County to the north, Biała County to the east, Radzyń County to the south-east, Lubartów County to the south, Ryki County to the south-west and Garwolin County to the west.

== Administrative divisions ==
The county is subdivided into 11 gminas (two urban and nine rural). These are listed in the following table, in descending order of population.

Gmina	Type	Area (km^{2})	Population (2019)	Seat
Łuków	urban	35.8	29,885	
Gmina Łuków	rural	308.3	18,144	Łuków (Note: seat not part of the gmina)
Gmina Krzywda	rural	161.1	10,490	Krzywda
Gmina Stanin	rural	160.3	9,754	Stanin
Gmina Stoczek Łukowski	rural	173.5	7,848	Stoczek Łukowski
Gmina Trzebieszów	rural	140.5	7,396	Trzebieszów
Gmina Wojcieszków	rural	108.6	6,879	Wojcieszków
Gmina Adamów	rural	98.9	5,594	Adamów
Gmina Wola Mysłowska	rural	121.0	4,682	Wola Mysłowska
Gmina Serokomla	rural	77.2	3,952	Serokomla
Stoczek Łukowski	urban	9.2	2,520	
