= Roman Paszkowski =

Polish military officer (1914–1998)

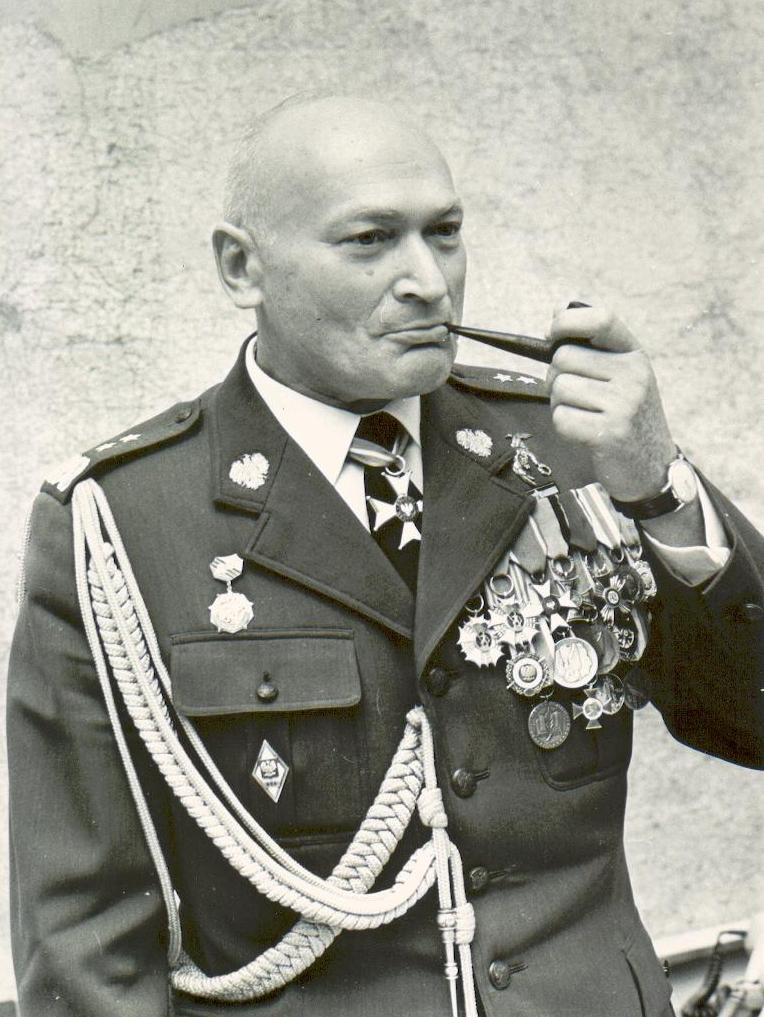
- Paszkowski in 1973

Chairman of the Council for the Protection of Struggle and Martyrdom Sites
- In office 1985–1990
- Preceded by: Wacław Jagas
- Succeeded by: Stanisław Broniewski

Voivode of Katowice Voivodeship
- In office 16 December 1981 – 18 May 1985
- Preceded by: Henryk Lichoś
- Succeeded by: Tadeusz Wnuk

Personal details
- Born: 19 July 1914 Gułów, Congress Poland
- Died: 16 August 1998 (aged 84) Katowice, Poland
- Party: Polish United Workers' Party
- Education: Świerczewski General Staff Academy

Military service
- Branch/service: Polish Armed Forces; Polish People's Army
- Rank: Brigadier general
- Battles/wars: World War II; Martial law in Poland

Roman Paszkowski (19 July 1914 – 16 August 1998) was a Polish military officer. He was participant of the defensive war of 1939, wounded twice during combat, prisoner of German Oflags (1939–1945), prisoner of the Stalinist period (1951–1955), commander of the 1st Anti-Aircraft Defense Corps (1959–1962), commander of the Polish Air Defence Force (1967–1976), ambassador of the Polish People's Republic to Angola (1976–1980), voivode of Katowice Voivodeship from 1981 to 1985, chairman of the Council for the Protection of Struggle and Martyrdom Sites from 1985 to 1990, member of the Polish People's Republic Sejm of the 9th term on behalf of the Polish United Workers' Party and also served as chairman of the Polish Army Generals' Club.

== Biography ==
=== Second Polish Republic and World War II ===
He was the son of Wacław Paszkowski (1886–1973) – administrator of the Gułów estate – and Stefania née Oprawska (1887–1964). From 1925 he attended the Adam Czartoryski State Male Gymnasium in Puławy, and then the Salesian Fathers Gymnasium in Sokołów Podlaski. A graduate of the Cadet Corps No. 3 in Rawicz (1934), where he passed his secondary school leaving exam in natural sciences and mathematics and an exam entitling him to start his studies in the second year of officer cadet school. In 1934 he began his studies at the Infantry Cadet School in Ostrów Mazowiecka. He did his internship in the 41st Suwałki Infantry Regiment. He was promoted to the rank of second lieutenant on 15 October 1936, with seniority from 15 October 1936 and 42nd place in the corps of infantry officers. The promotion was made by Brig. Gen. Emil Krukowicz-Przedrzymirski. In the years 1936–1939 he served in the 22nd Infantry Regiment in Siedlce as a platoon commander of reserve officer cadets (from October 1936 to July 1937), platoon commander in the regimental non-commissioned officer school (from July 1937 to March 1938), platoon commander of the recruit company (from March to May 1938), commander of the rifle company (from May to September 1938), commander of the sniper platoon of the 9th company (from September 1938 to March 1939), and then from March 1938 commander of the infantry company.

In the defensive war of 1939, he fought at the head of the 7th company of the 22nd Infantry Regiment of the 9th Infantry Division in the area of Lake Koronowskie, near Bydgoszcz and Kutno, in the advance zone of the XIX Panzer Corps of General Heinz Guderian. His company distinguished itself in combat, and he himself was wounded twice during the fighting (on September 4 in the back by a random shrapnel from a tank gun, on September 19 during an air raid on the hospital where he was lying). For his bravery in combat, he was awarded the Silver Cross of the Order of Virtuti Militari only after 7 years. After being captured by the Germans, he was initially kept in a field hospital in Dobrzelin, and then in a hospital near Berlin, from where he was transported to the Oflag in Braunschweig. In the years 1941–1945 he was imprisoned in Oflag II-C in Woldenberg; he participated in the camp resistance movement organized by the Home Army, and also completed a secret course for air observers.

In January 1945, the camp was gradually evacuated by the Germans towards Lübeck, where Roman Paszkowski was liberated by the British.

=== Military career in the Polish People's Republic ===
After returning to Poland, he joined the Polish Army on 25 July 1945. After completing a course for battalion commanders at the Infantry Training Centre in Rembertów (22 October 1945), he was sent to the General Staff of the Polish People's Army. In the years 1946–1948, he was the head of the Department of Military Foreign Affairs of the General Staff of the Polish Army (he had been sent there a year earlier on the recommendation of General Józef Kuropieska, a colleague from the time of captivity). From November 1948, he studied at the Świerczewski General Staff Academy, and from 1947, part-time at the Main School of the Foreign Service.

In January 1951, he was unjustly arrested by the Military Information Service on charges of espionage for capitalist countries; for 4 years of investigation, he was subjected to physical and psychological pressure, held in a solitary cell, without contact with his family or the possibility of taking walks. He was one of the first pre-war officers arrested as part of an investigation into alleged conspiracy to overthrow the state system by force and espionage, as well as connections with the group of General Stanisław Tatar and General Jerzy Kirchmayer. By an order of the Minister of National Defense of 14 December 1951, he was dismissed from the army. In February 1955, the investigation against him was discontinued due to lack of evidence of guilt and he was released.

=== Further military career ===
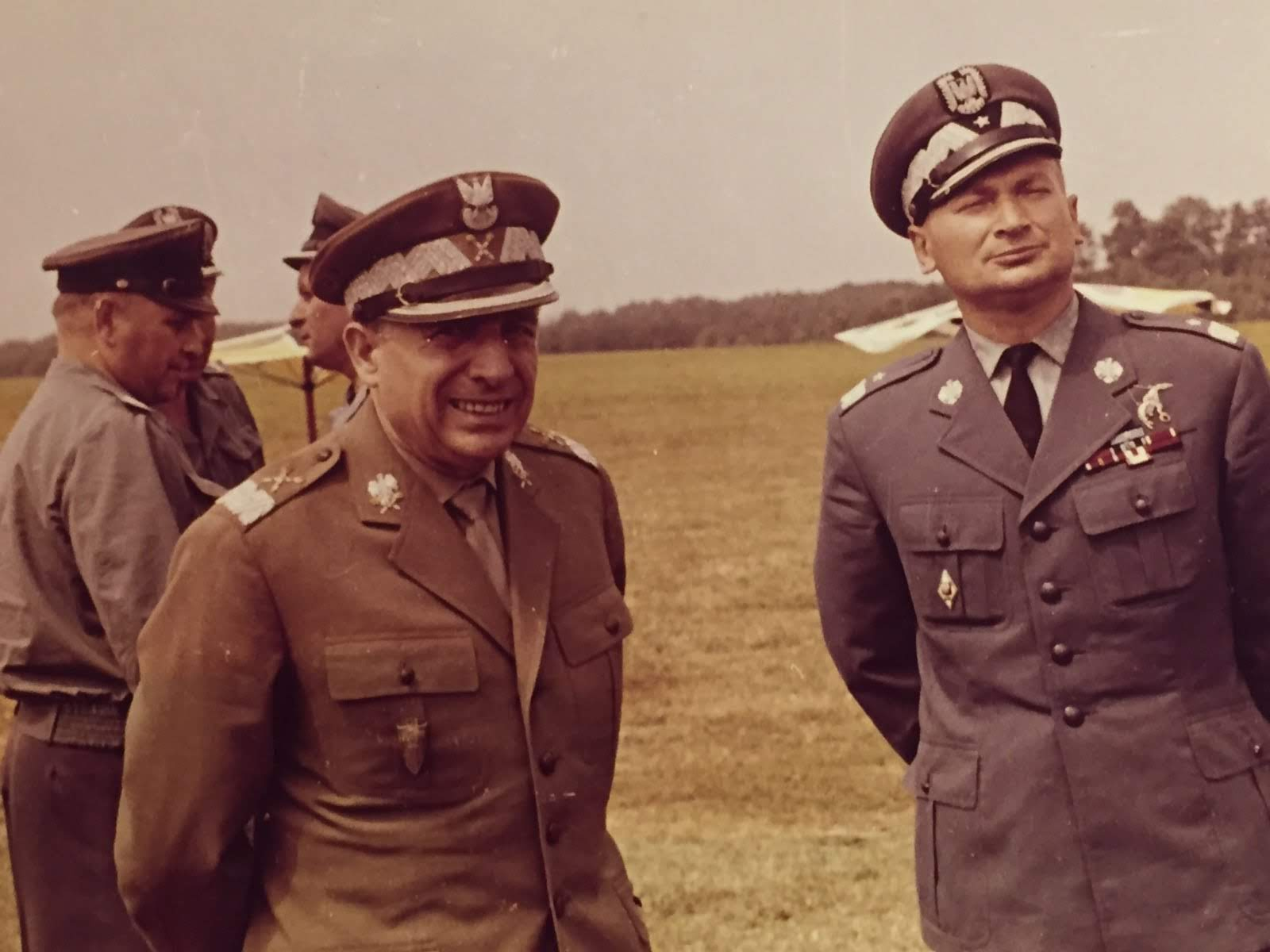
Marshal Marian Spychalski in the company of General Pilot Roman Paszkowski at the military airport, 1967

After his release in 1955, in the years 1955–1957 he worked as deputy director of a department in the Ministry of Agriculture. After the political changes in Poland in October 1956, he wrote a report for re-admission to service in the Polish People's Army. In accordance with the order of the Ministry of National Defense, in January 1957 he was re-admitted to the army and appointed head of the Military School of the Warsaw University of Technology. In September 1957, after passing the last exams, he received a diploma of graduation from the Świerczewski General Staff Academy of the Polish People's Army. In turn, he received a diploma of graduation from the Main School of Foreign Service in December 1956.

From August 1957, he served in the Air Force and Anti-Aircraft Defense of the Country Area (WL and OPL OK). He was successively commander of the Central Command Post of the Commander of the Air Force and OPL OK (from August 1957 to May 1959), chief of staff of the Anti-Aircraft Defense of the Country Area (from May to December 1959) and commander of the 1st Anti-Aircraft Defense Corps of the Country Area (from December 1959 to July 1962). In 1960, he completed an individual pilot training course and obtained the title of military pilot. His instructors were later generals Marian Bondzior and Władysław Hermaszewski. He flew TS-8 Bies and Jak-12 aircraft. On 22 September 1961, by resolution of the State Council, he was promoted to brigadier general. The nomination was presented on 29 September 1961, in the Belweder Palace by the chairman of the State Council of the Polish People's Republic, Aleksander Zawadzki.

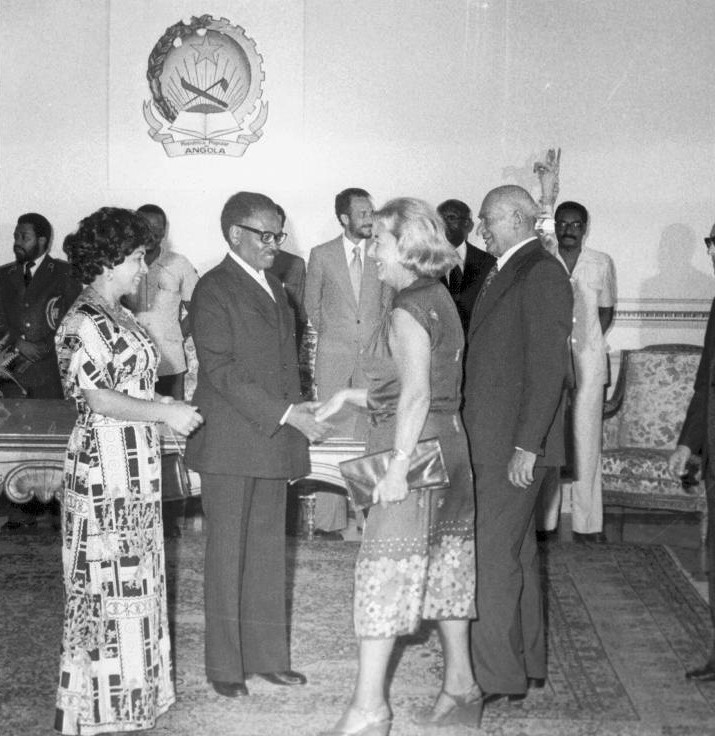
Paszkowski as the Polish Ambassador and his wife Aleksandra (right) extend their best wishes to the President of the People's Republic of Angola, Agostinho Neto, and his wife Eugenia, on the occasion of the New Year, Luanda, Angola, 1978

After the establishment of the Polish Air Defence Force in July 1962 as a separate branch of the armed forces, he was appointed deputy commander of these forces for combat training, and then (from 1963) for line matters. On 28 July 1967, he took over as commander of the National Air Defense Forces, replacing the dismissed general Czesław Mankiewicz. He contributed to the significant development of these forces. On 9 October 1968, he was promoted to division general. The nomination was presented to him in the Belweder Palace on 12 October 1968 by the chairman of the State Council of the Polish People's Republic, Marshal of Poland Marian Spychalski. On 3 October 1989, he was promoted to the rank of Lieutenant General. The nomination was presented to him in the Belweder palace on 9 October 1989 by the President of the Polish People's Republic, Wojciech Jaruzelski. In November 1985, he was officially bid farewell by the Minister of National Defense, Florian Siwicki, in connection with the end of his professional military service and in January 1986 he was retired. In total, he served in the Polish Armed Forces for 57 years (with a five-year break related to his arrest during the Stalinist era), of which 25 years in the rank of general.

He was a member of the Polish Workers' Party 1946 to 1948 and a member of the Polish United Workers' Party from 1948 to the collapse of the Polish People's Republic 1990. In the years 1976–1980 he was on leave from the army due to being appointed by the State Council to the position of the Polish People's Republic ambassador to Angola, and from 1979 also to the Islands of São Tomé and Príncipe. During martial law on 16 December 1981, after the Pacification of Wujek mine, he was appointed by Prime Minister Wojciech Jaruzelski to the position of Katowice voivode. In the position of voivode he contributed to calming the mood in Silesia, for which he received, among other things, thanks from the bishop of the Katowice diocese, Herbert Bednorz. From September 1983 he was the chairman of the Convention of Voivodes. In January 1984 he became a member of the executive of the Provincial Committee of the Polish United Workers' Party in Katowice, from which he resigned in May 1985 due to the end of his work in Katowice.

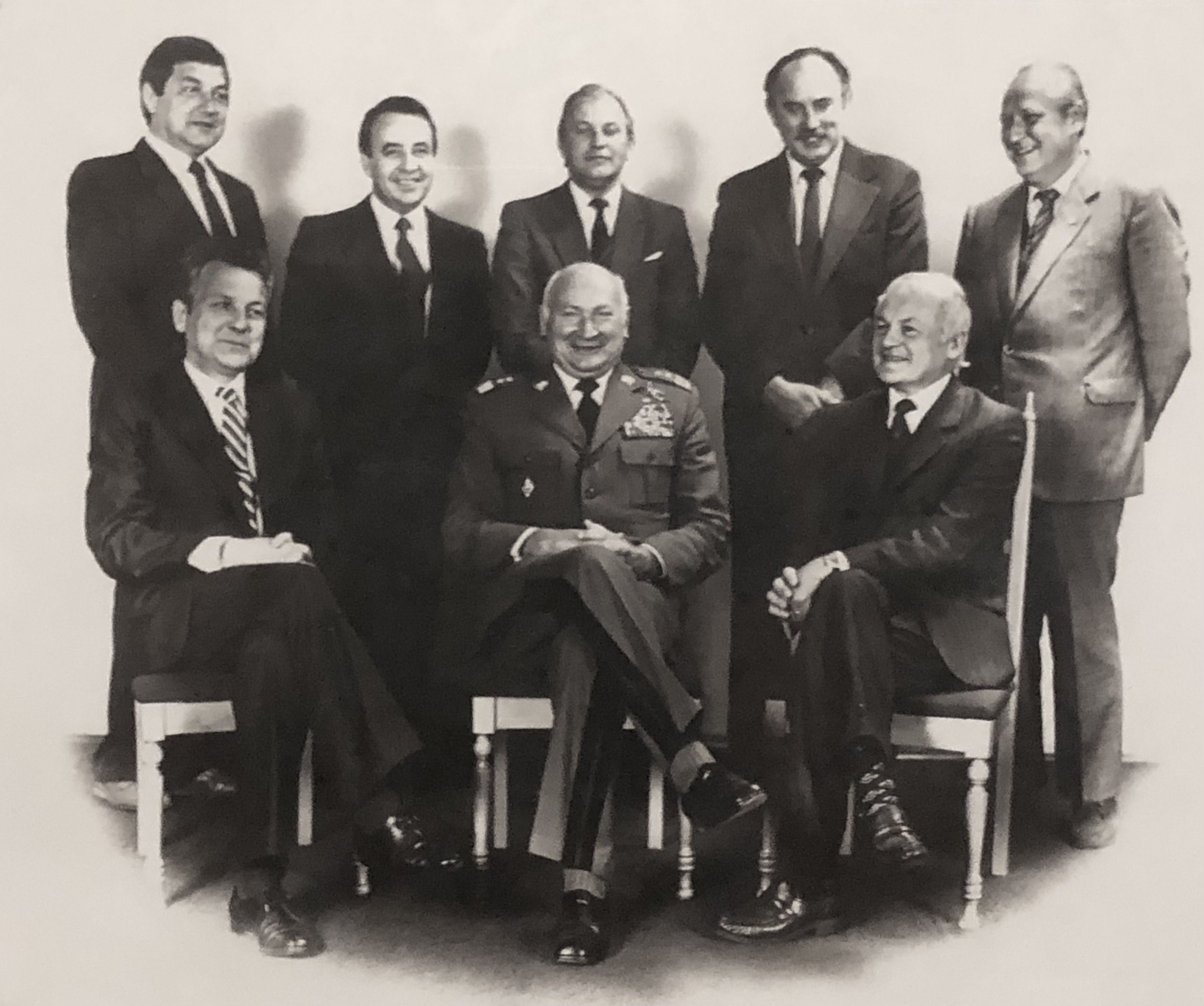
Paszkowski as voivode of Katowice Voivodeship with deputy voivodes, 1985

From 17 May 1985 to 28 February 1990 he served as chairman of the Council for the Protection of Struggle and Martyrdom Sites. He was th initiator of the commemoration of officers murdered in the east. In April 1989 he organized the first pilgrimage of the Katyn Families to Katyn and the transport of urns from the Katyn Polish War Cemetery to Warsaw and their ceremonial deposition at Powązki Cemetery and the Tomb of the Unknown Soldier. On his initiative, the Commission for Commemorating the Victims of Stalinism was established at the Council, headed by Zenon Komender. He made a major contribution to commemorating the combat deeds of the Polish Armed Forces in the West. One of the main patrons of the construction of the Kleeberczyks' Museum of Combat Action in Wola Gułowska.

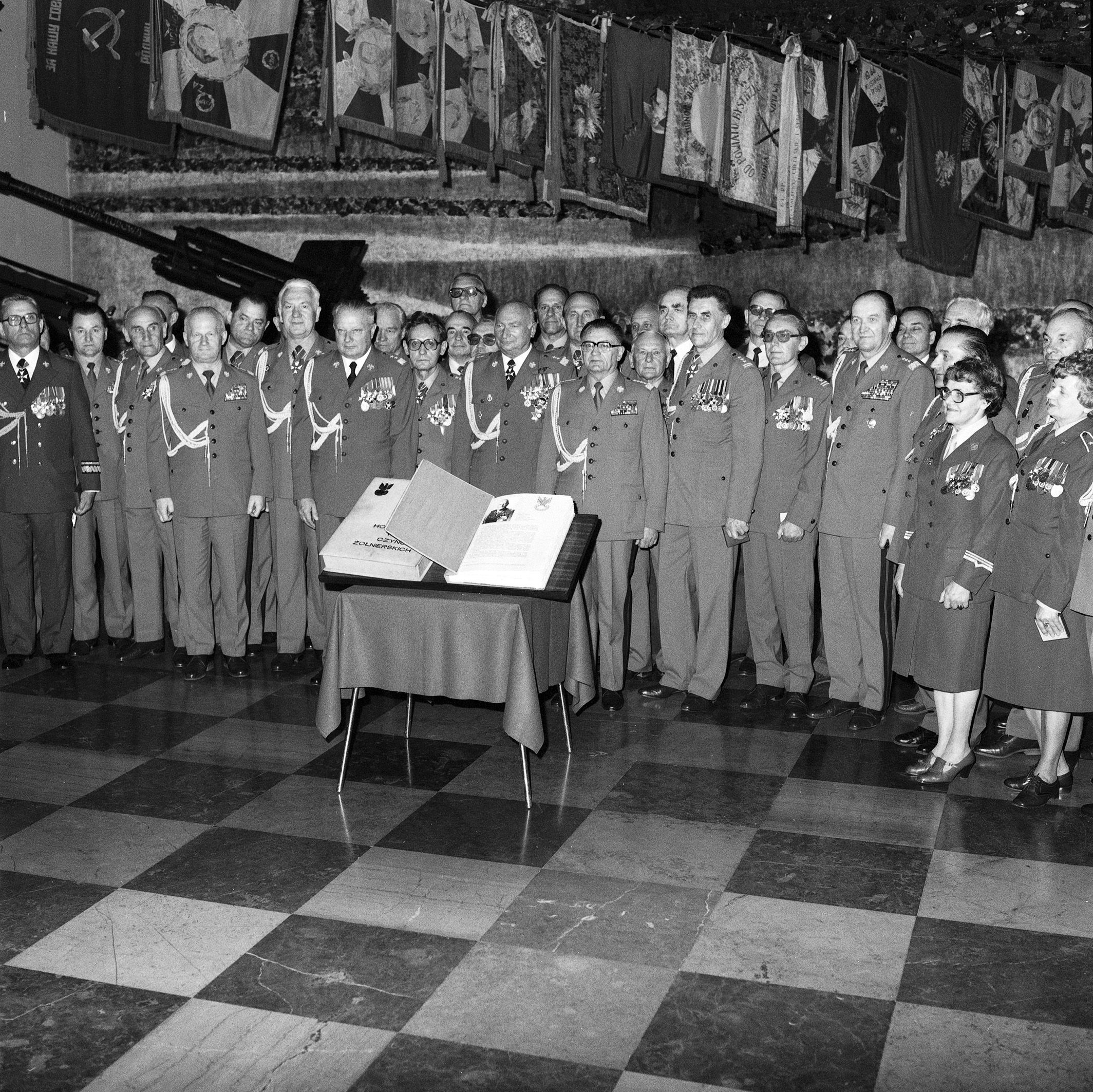
Meeting of the Ministry of National Defense leadership with all generals, officers and soldiers of the Polish Army entered into the Honorary Book of Soldiers' Deeds since its establishment on the occasion of the 40th anniversary of the Victory, Victory Hall of the Polish Army Museum, 9 May 1985. From the left: Rear Admiral Aleksy Parol, Lieutenant General Józef Użycki, Brig. Gen. Marian Pasternak, Lieutenant General Józef Baryła, Brig. Gen. Henryk Kondas, Brig. Gen. Władysław Jura, Maj. Gen. Wiesław Wojciechowski, NN, Maj. Gen. Pilot Roman Paszkowski, Army Gen. Florian Siwicki, Col. Henryk Gradzik, Col. Roman Leś, Col. Tadeusz Bieniasz, NN, Lieutenant General Mieczysław Obiedziński, Col. Stefan Rutkowski, Col. Prof. Stanisław Barański and others

In addition, in 1985–1989, he was a member of the Sejm of the Polish People's Republic of the 9th term and chairman of the Sejm's Constitutional Accountability Committee. In 1974–1979 and 1985–1990, he was a member of the Supreme Council of the Society of Fighters for Freedom and Democracy, in 1986 vice-chairman of the Honorary Committee of the Encyclopedia of National Remembrance. In 1986–1989, he was a member of the National Grunwald Committee. Chairman of the Honorary Committee for the Reconstruction of the Piast Castle in Racibórz. On 11 November 1988 he joined the Honorary Committee for the Celebration of the 70th Anniversary of Poland Regaining Independence, chaired by the First Secretary of the Central Committee of the Polish United Workers' Party, Wojciech Jaruzelski. In 1989 he became a member of the Commission for the Revalorization of the Lychakiv Cemetery in Lviv and the Commission for the Care and Ordering of the Rasos Cemetery in Vilnius. In 1989 he was a member of the Citizens' Committee for the Revalorization of the Tomb of the Unknown Soldier in Warsaw, chaired by Brig. Gen. Stanisław Skalski and chairman of the Social Committee of the Monte Cassino Monument Foundation in Zabrze. In 1989 he ran for the Senate of the Polish People's Republic from the Warsaw voivodeship. From February 1990 to February 1991 he was vice-chairman of the Council for the Protection of Memory of Combat and Martyrdom of the new term.

He was a sports aviation activist, in 1964–1968 president, and since 1968 honorary president of the Warsaw Aeroclub.

Since 1990 he has been active in the veterans' community. In 1996, he was one of the group of generals – co-founders of the Polish Army Generals' Club, and in the years 1996–1998 he was the first president of the Polish Army Generals' Club. He was also vice-president of the Foundation of Awards and Distinctions named after the Heroes of the Parachute Tower operating in Katowice, the aim of which was to commemorate the heroism of Silesian scouts during the fighting in September 1939.

=== Commemoration of the Katyn Massacre ===
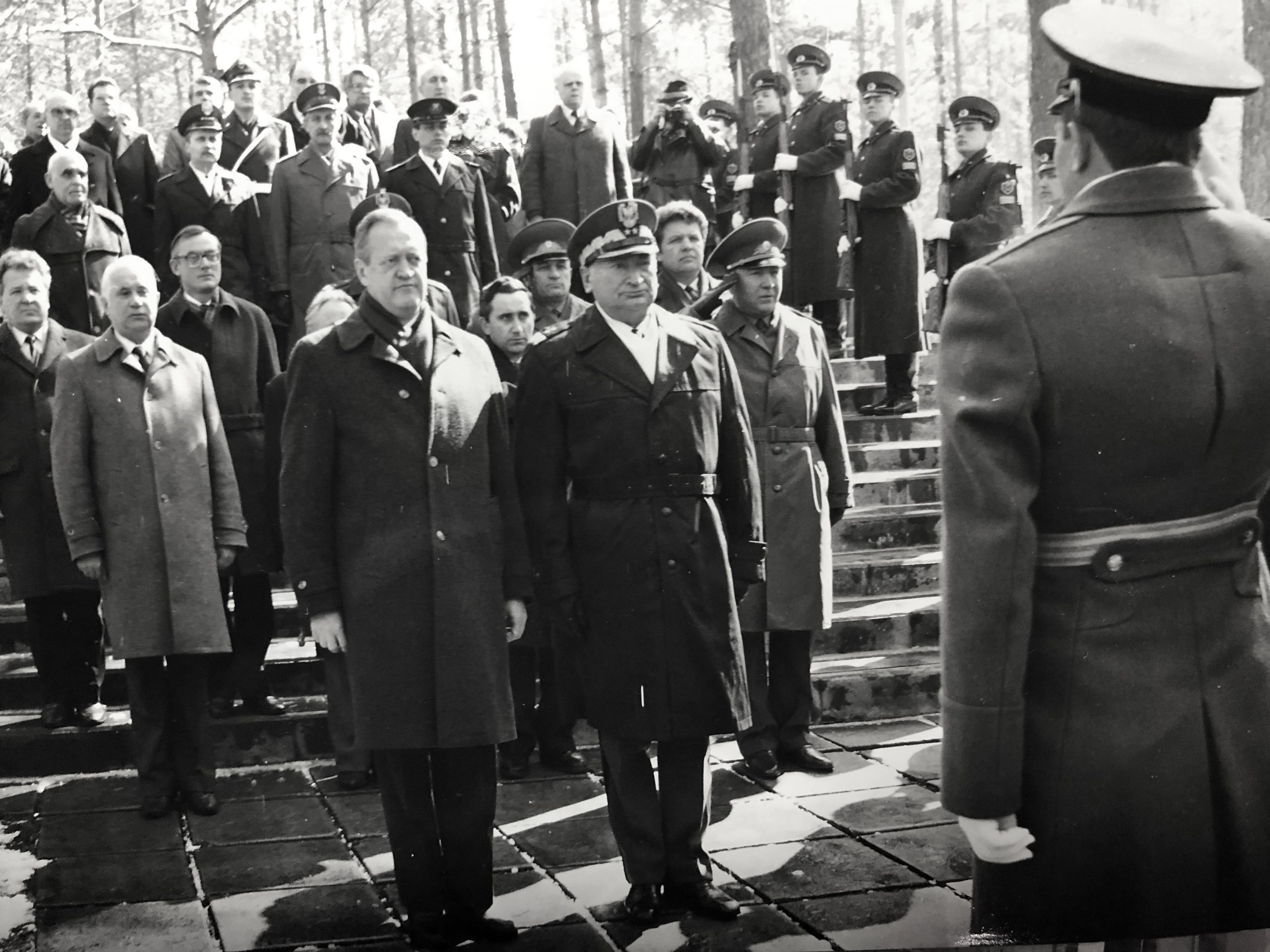
Ceremony of collecting soil from the Katyn graves by the government delegation and families of the victims of the Katyn crime, 5 April 1989, in the middle the chairman of the Council for the Protection of Memory of Combat and Martyrdom, Gen. Roman Paszkowski

He was the first representative of the Polish People's Republic to officially visit Katyn (in 1987). In 1987, he spoke in the weekly "Panorama" that everywhere where Poles died on the territory of the Soviet Union, monuments and commemorative plaques must be erected. He also mentioned the number of 15,000 Polish officers and stated: "We must tell our grandchildren the truth". On 5 April 1989, he organized a trip to Katyn by special plane of a state delegation and a group of Katyn families. A mass was held there and soil was collected from the mass graves. On 18 April 1989, it was placed in the niche of the Tomb of the Unknown Soldier and under the Katyn monument at the Powązki Military Cemetery. In the autumn of 1989, the Council for the Protection of Struggle and Martyrdom Sites, under his chairmanship, organized the first special train to Katyn for the families of the murdered.

He died on 16 August 1998 in Katowice, where he participated in the ordination jubilee of a priest friend. On 20 August, Bishop Wiktor Skworc of Tarnów celebrated a funeral mass for the general in the Archcathedral of Christ the King in Katowice.

He was buried on 21 August 1998 with full honors at the Powązki Military Cemetery in Warsaw (section D6-2-39). The funeral ceremony was preceded by a mass in the military cathedral of the Polish Army in Warsaw, celebrated by the military bishop of the Polish Army, Maj. Gen. Sławoj Leszek Głódź. The mass was attended by a delegation of clergy from Katowice representing Archbishop Damian Zimoń. The funeral was attended by, among others, former President of Poland Wojciech Jaruzelski, former Prime Minister of the Polish People's Republic, Zbigniew Messner, former First Secretary of the Central Committee of the Polish United Workers' Party Stanisław Kania, generals, representatives of pilots from all over the country. The funeral ceremonies were conducted by the Deputy Dean of the Polish Army, Rev. Colonel Jan Mrugacz. Funeral speeches were delivered by: Maj. Gen. Jarosław Bielecki – on behalf of the General Staff of the Polish Army, Lt. Gen. Pilot Jerzy Gotowała – on behalf of the soldiers of the Air Force and Air Defence, and Brig. Gen. Dr. Jan Celek – on behalf of the Generals' Club of the Polish Army.

== Awards ==
- Silver Cross of the Order of Virtuti Militari (1946; on 13 April 1967 the same decoration was approved by the Ministry of National Defence of the Polish People's Republic for participants of escapes from camp II C)
- Grand Cross of the Order of Polonia Restituta (20 August 1998, posthumously)
- Commander's Cross with Star of the Order of Polonia Restituta (1983)
- Commander's Cross of the Order of Polonia Restituta (1969)
- Knight's Cross of the Order of Polonia Restituta (1946)
- Order of the Banner of Labour (1973)
- Order of the Banner of Labour, 2nd class (1963)
- Gold Cross of Merit (1958)
- Medal of Victory and Freedom 1945 (1945)
- Medal "For Participation in the Defensive War 1939" (1982)
- Medal of the 30th Anniversary of People's Poland (1974)
- Medal of the 40th Anniversary of People's Poland (1984)
- Medal for Long Marital Life (1997)
- Medal of the National Education Commission (1973)
- Gold Medal of the Armed Forces in the Service of the Fatherland (1968)
- Silver Medal of the Armed Forces in the Service of the Fatherland (1958)
- Gold Medal of the Armed Forces in the Service of the Fatherland(1973)
- Silver Medal of Merit for National Defence (1968)
- Bronze Medal of Merit for National Defence (1966)
- Bronze Badge "For Merit in the Protection of Public Order" (1974)
- Golden Badge of Honour "Meritorious for Mining PRL" (1984)
- Golden Badge of Honor "For Merit to Construction and the Building Materials Industry" (1972)
- Golden Badge of Honor "For Merit to Civil Defense" (1983)
- Silver Badge of Honor "For Merit to Spatial Management" (1985)
- Bronze Badge of Honor "For Merit to Fire Protection" (1985)
- Golden {{[ill|Badge "For Merit to Physical Culture Activist"|pl|Odznaka „Zasłużony Działacz Kultury Fizycznej”}} (1976)
- Veteran of the Struggle for Independence Badge (1995)
- Grunwald Badge (1946)
- Military Pilot Badge (1960)
- Golden Badge of Honor of the Polish Red Cross, 1st degree (1973)
- Golden Decoration of Janek Krasicki (1971)
- Gold Medal "Guardian of National Remembrance Sites" (1987)
- Gold Cross "For Merit to the Polish Scouting Association" (1983)
- Gold Medal "For Merit to the Country Defense League" (1983)
- Honorary Badge of the 1st Degree "For Merit to Polish Airlines - LOT" with three diamonds (1976)
- Badge "For Merit to Sports Aviation" (1967)
- Badge of the 1000th Anniversary of the Polish State (1966)
- Gold Medal of Jan Kiliński with a badge (awarded by the presidium of the National Council of Crafts, 1983)
- Golden Badge of the Military Youth Circles (1964)
- Medal "For Merit for the National Defense League" (1978)
- Medal and diploma "For Merit and Exemplary Work" (Ministry of Administration and Spatial Economy, 1984)
- Medal "For Merit for the Aeroclub of the Polish People's Republic"
- Golden Honorary Badge of the Polish Tourist and Sightseeing Society (PTTK) (1975)
- Badge "Meritorious Activist of the Polish Military Association" (1973)
- Golden Sign of the Union of Volunteer Fire Departments (1968)
- Golden Honorary Badge of the Free Polish University Society (1982)
- Medal For Merit for the Defense Knowledge Society
- Golden Honorary Badge of the Central Union of Construction Cooperatives Housing (1982)
- Golden Honorary Badge of the Rural Youth Association (1984)
- Honorary Token of Merit "Złom" of the Polish Hunting Association (1983)
- Golden Medal of Merit for Hunting (1974)
- Golden Badge "For Merit to the University of Silesia" (1984)
- Badge "For Merit to the Academy of Economics in Katowice" (1985)
- Graduate's Badge of the Corps of Cadets No. 3 (1934)
- Medal of the General Staff of the Polish Army "Amor Patriae Suprema Lex" (1976)
- Badge "For Merit to the Silesian Military District" (1972)
- Medal "For Merit to the Air Defense Forces of the Country" (1976)
- Medal "For Merit to the Aviation" (1979)
- Medal "For Merit to Navy" (twice – 1973 and 1983)
- Commemorative Medal "For Merit to the Pomeranian Military District" (1974)
- Medal "For Merit to the Vistula Military Units of the Ministry of Internal Affairs" (1983)[32]
- Medal "50th Anniversary of Sports Aviation in Poland" (1969)
- Commemorative Ring of the National Defense Academy (1993)
- Honorary Badge "For Merit to the Association of Former Professional Soldiers" (1985)
- Golden Honorary Badge of Reserve Officers Clubs (1984)
- Badge "For Merit to the Union of Fighters for Freedom and Democracy" (1987)
- Badge of the Infantry Training Center (1946)
- Medal "For Long-Term, Devoted Service" (awarded by the Minister of National Defense, 1985)
- Commemorative Badge "For cooperation and assistance in the activities of the SGO "Polesie" Soldiers' Circle, Brig. Gen. F. Kleeberg” (1986)
- Badge of Merit for the Kielce Region (1973)
- Golden Badge of Honor "For Merit for Warsaw" (1970)
- Badge of "Builder of Wrocław" (1968)
- Golden Badge of "Merit for Lower Silesia" (1968)
- Great Golden Badge of Honor "For Merit in the Development of the Katowice Voivodeship" (twice – 1982 and 1985[36])
- Golden Badge of Merit “For Merit in the Development of the Katowice Voivodeship” (twice – 1961 and 1969)
- Golden Badge of Honor “For Merit for Warmia and Mazury” (1971)
- Badge of Merit for Bieszczady (twice – 1985 and 1987)
- Honorary Badge "For Merits in the Development of the Koszalin Voivodeship" (1974)
- Honorary Badge of the Pomeranian Griffin (1970)
- Honorary Badge "For Merits for the Krosno Voivodeship, 1st Degree" (1987)
- Gold Badge of Honour "For Merit to the Białystok Region" (1990)
- Badge of Honour "For Merits to the Gorzów Voivodeship" (1989)
- Badge of Honour "For Merits to the City and Commune of Dobiegniew" (1987)
- Badge "For Merits to Wola Gułowska" (1986)
- Order of the Red Banner (USSR, 1968)
- Order of Friendship of Peoples (USSR, 1973)
- Medal "For Strengthening of Brotherhood in Arms" (USSR, 1985)
- Jubilee Medal "Twenty Years of Victory in the Great Patriotic War 1941–1945" (USSR, 1972)
- Badge "25 Years of Victory in the Great Patriotic War of 1941–45" (USSR, 1970)
- Jubilee Medal "Thirty Years of Victory in the Great Patriotic War 1941–1945" (USSR, 1975)
- Jubilee Medal "Forty Years of Victory in the Great Patriotic War 1941–1945" (USSR, 1985)
- Silver Patriotic Order of Merit (GDR, 1975)
- Medal "For Strengthening Friendship of the Armed Forces", 2nd degree (CSSR, 1970)
- Medal "40 Years of the Slovak National Uprising and Liberation of Czechoslovakia by the Soviet Army" (CSSR, 1985)
- Honorary Badge of the Czechoslovak Youth Union (CSSR, 1967)
- Knight's Cross of the Order of Civil Merit (Bulgaria, 1948)
- Medal "30 Years of Bulgarian People's Army" (Bulgaria, 1974)
- Medal of the 1300th Anniversary of Bulgaria (Bulgaria, 1983)
- Friendship Medal (Socialist Republic of Vietnam, 1976)
- Liberation Medal, 1st class (Republic of South Vietnam, 1976)
- Medal of Ferdinand Foch (France, 1972)
- Commemorative Medal of the Hungarian Defense Association (1984)
- Commemorative Medal of the City of Loreto with engraving (15 May 1987)
- Entry in the Honorary Book of Soldiers' Deeds (1977)
