= Natalin =

Natalin may refer to the following places:

- Natalin, Chełm County in Lublin Voivodeship (east Poland)
- Natalin, Gmina Annopol in Lublin Voivodeship (east Poland)
- Natalin, Gmina Urzędów in Lublin Voivodeship (east Poland)
- Natalin, Lubartów County in Lublin Voivodeship (east Poland)
- Natalin, Lublin County in Lublin Voivodeship (east Poland)
- Natalin, Łuków County in Lublin Voivodeship (east Poland)
- Natalin, Grójec County in Masovian Voivodeship (east-central Poland)
- Natalin, Radom County in Masovian Voivodeship (east-central Poland)
- Natalin, Wyszków County in Masovian Voivodeship (east-central Poland)
