= Crypt =

Subterranean chamber for burials

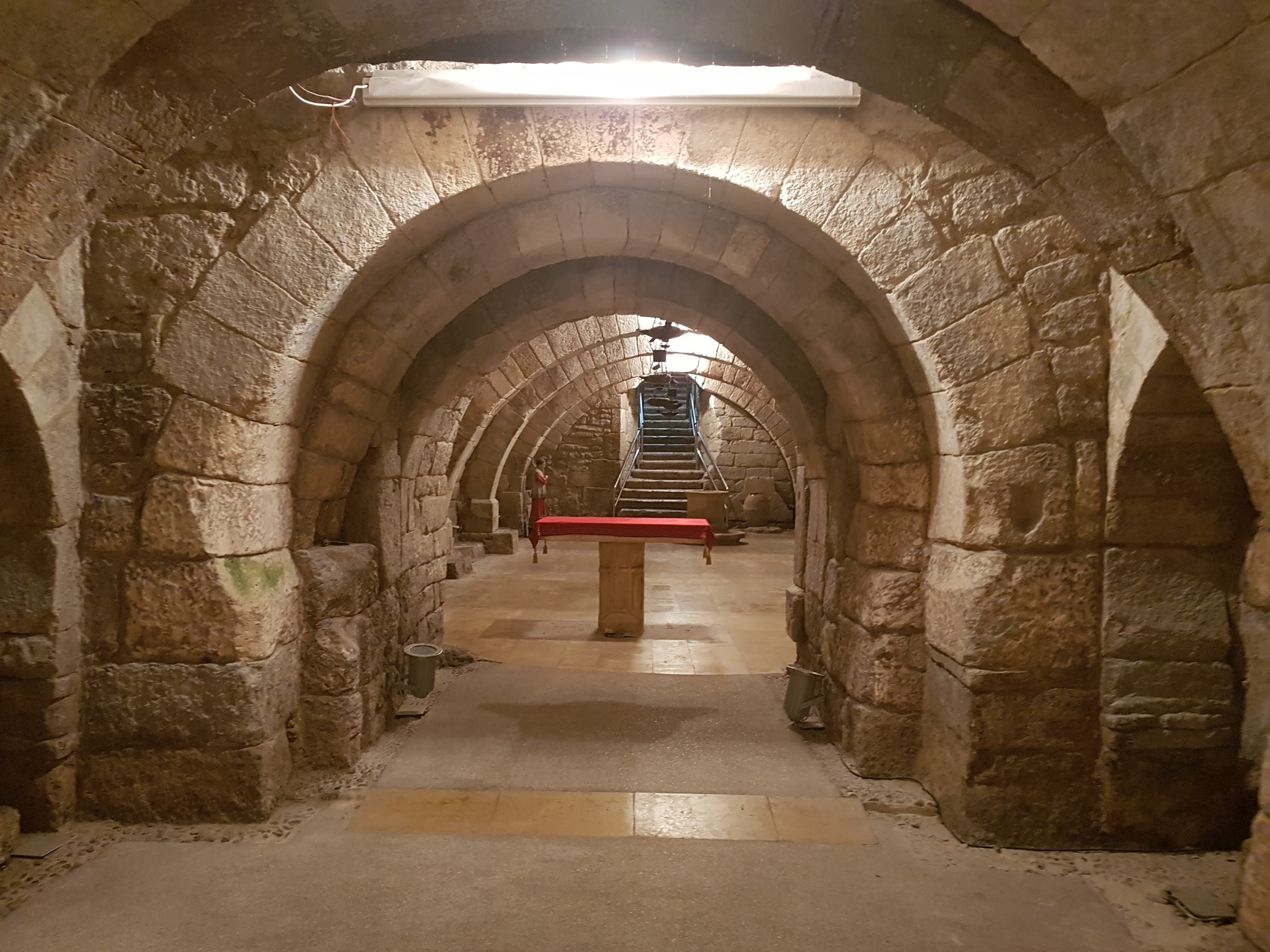
Visigothic crypt of Saint Antoninus Palencia Cathedral in Spain

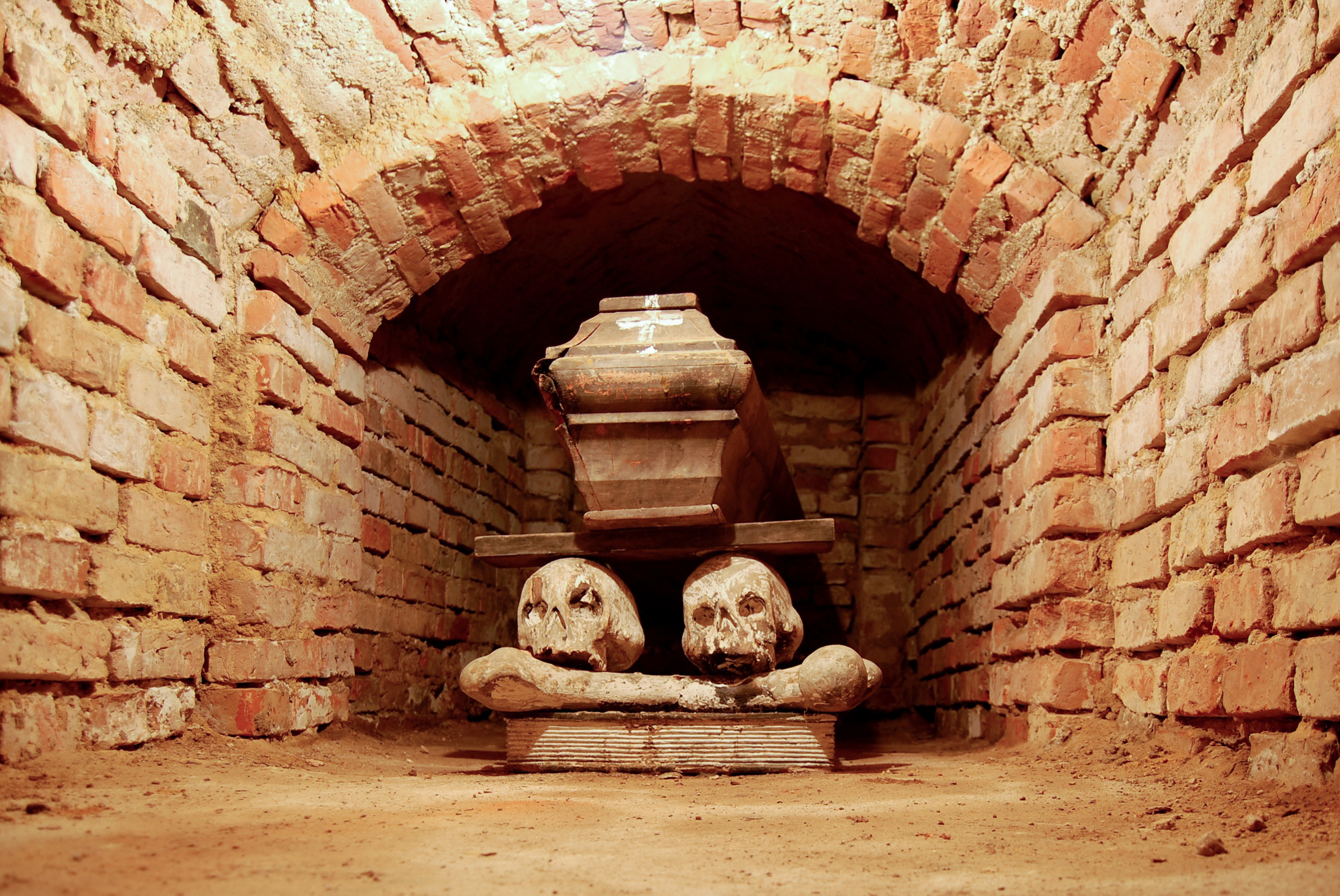
A crypt in Wola Gułowska in Lublin Province, Poland

A crypt (from Ancient Greek κρύπτη (kryptē) crypta 'vault') is a chamber beneath the floor of a church, above ground within a cemetery's mausoleum or a free-standing outdoor memorial tomb. It typically contains coffins, sarcophagi, or religious relics and sometimes cremation urns.

Originally, crypts were typically found below the main apse of a church, such as at the Abbey of Saint-Germain en Auxerre, but were later located beneath chancel, naves and transepts as well. Occasionally churches were raised high to accommodate a crypt at the ground level, such as St Michael's Church in Hildesheim, Germany.

== Etymology ==
The word "crypt" developed as an alternative form of the Latin "vault" as it was carried over into Late Latin, and came to refer to the ritual rooms found underneath church buildings. It also served as a vault for storing important and/or sacred items.

The word "crypta", however, is also the female form of crypto "hidden". The earliest known origin of both is in the Ancient Greek κρύπτω, the first person singular indicative of the verb "to conceal, to hide".

== Development ==
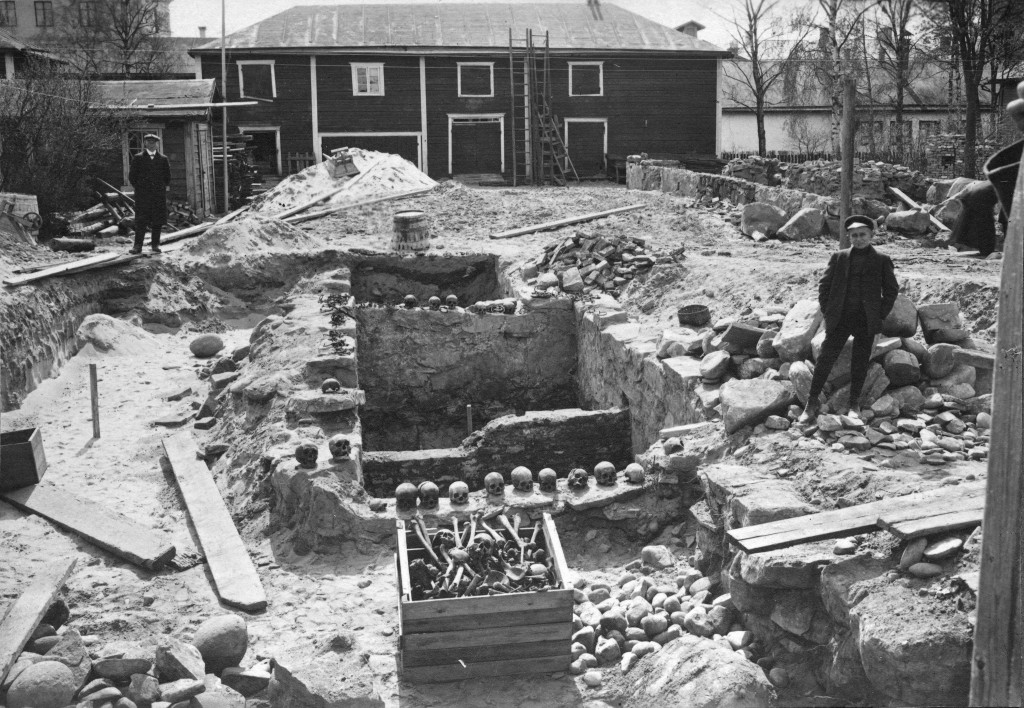
The 17th century crypt found in 1911 in the city of Pori, Finland

First known in the early Christian period, in particular North Africa at Chlef and Djemila in Algeria, and Byzantium at Saint John Studio in Constantinople where Christian churches have been built over mithraea, the mithraeum has often been adapted to serve as a crypt.

The famous crypt at Old St. Peter's Basilica, Rome, developed about the year 600, as a means of affording pilgrims a view of Saint Peter's tomb, which lay according to the Roman fashion, directly below the high altar. The tomb was made accessible through an underground passageway beneath the sanctuary from where pilgrims could enter at one stair, pass by the tomb and exit without interrupting the clerical community's service at the altar directly above.

The Visigothic crypt (the Crypt of San Antolín) in Palencia Cathedral (Spain), was built during the reign of Wamba to preserve the remains of the martyr Saint Antoninus of Pamiers, a Visigothic-Gallic nobleman brought from Narbonne to Visigothic Hispania in 672 or 673 by Wamba himself. These are the only remains of the Visigothic cathedral of Palencia.

Crypts were introduced into Frankish church building in the mid-8th century, as a feature of its Romanization. Their popularity then spread more widely in western Europe under Charlemagne. Examples from this period are most common in the early medieval West, for example in Burgundy at Dijon and Tournus.

After the 10th century, the early medieval requirements of a crypt faded, as church officials permitted relics to be held in the main level of the church. By the Gothic period crypts were rarely built, however burial vaults continued to be constructed beneath churches and referred to as crypts.

== Burial vaults ==
In more modern terms, a crypt is most often a stone chambered burial vault used to store the deceased. Placing a corpse into a crypt can be called immurement, and is a method of final disposition, as an alternative to, for example, cremation. Crypts are usually found in cemeteries and under public religious buildings, such as churches or cathedrals, but are also occasionally found beneath mausoleums or chapels on personal estates. Wealthy or prestigious families will often have a 'family crypt' or 'vault', in which all members of the family are interred. Many royal families, for example, have vast crypts containing the bodies of dozens of former royalty. In some localities, an above-ground crypt is more commonly called a "mausoleum", which also refers to any elaborate building intended as a burial place, for any number of people. In the case of cremation, urns would be entombed in columbariums.

There was a trend in the 19th century of building crypts on medium to large size family estates, usually subtly placed on the edge of the grounds or more commonly incorporated into the cellar. After a change of owner, these are often blocked up and the house deeds will not allow this area to be re-developed.

== Gallery ==
Crypt of the Monastery of the Holy Cross and the Prophet Elijah, Sweden

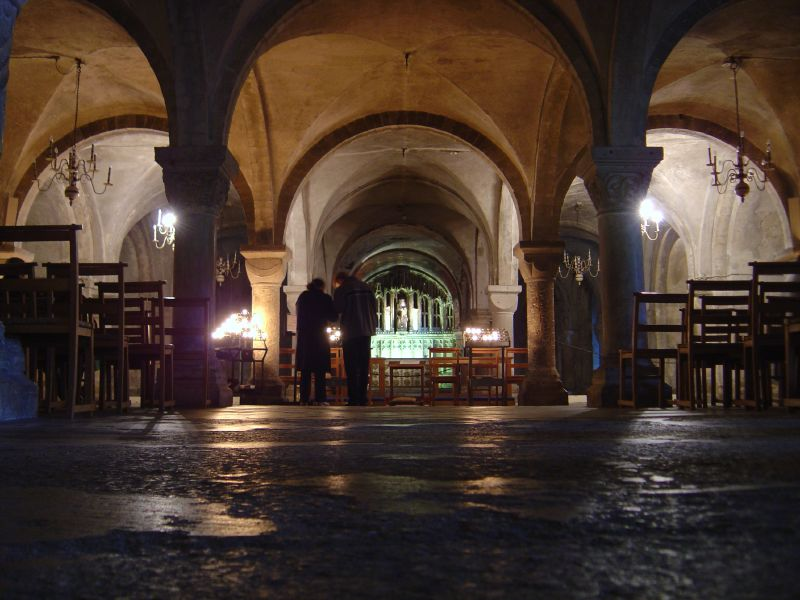
Crypt of Canterbury Cathedral, England

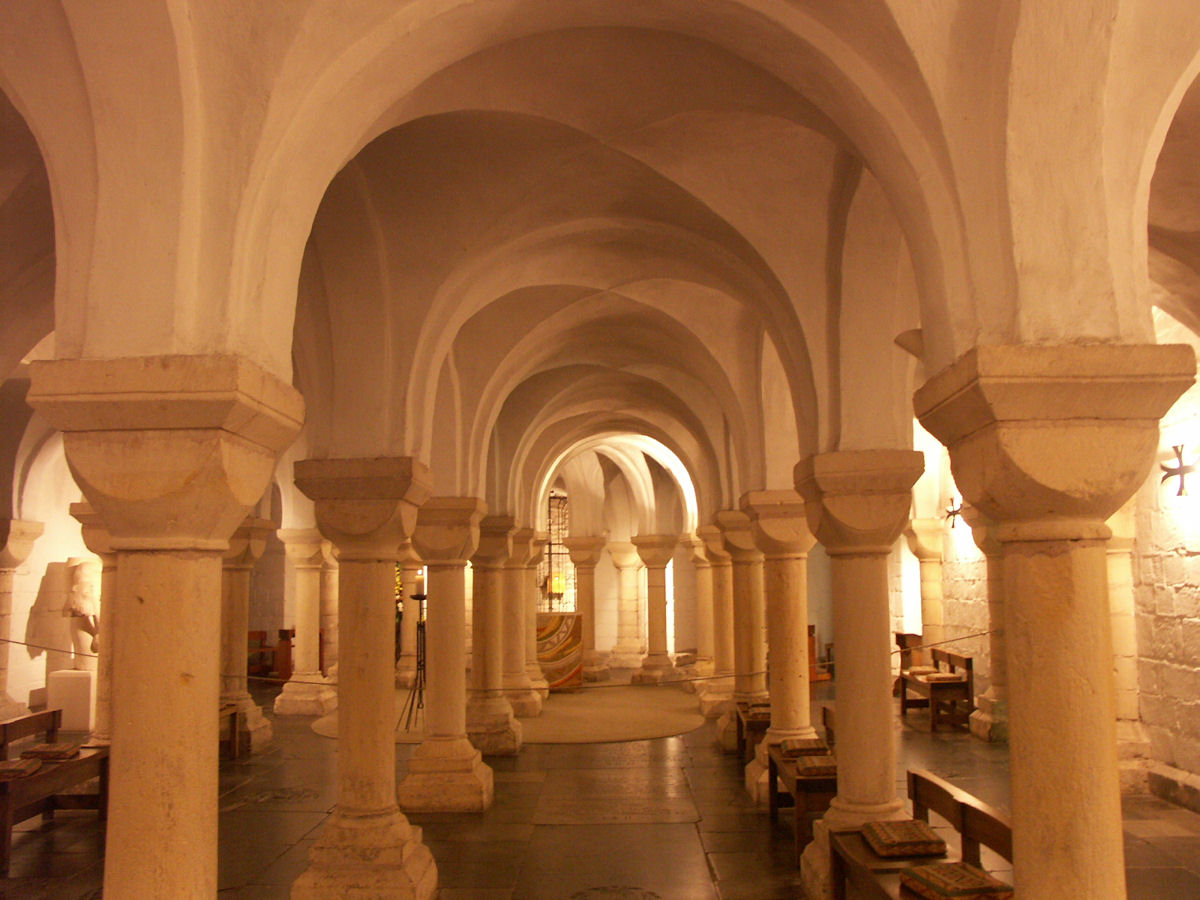
Crypt of Worcester Cathedral, England

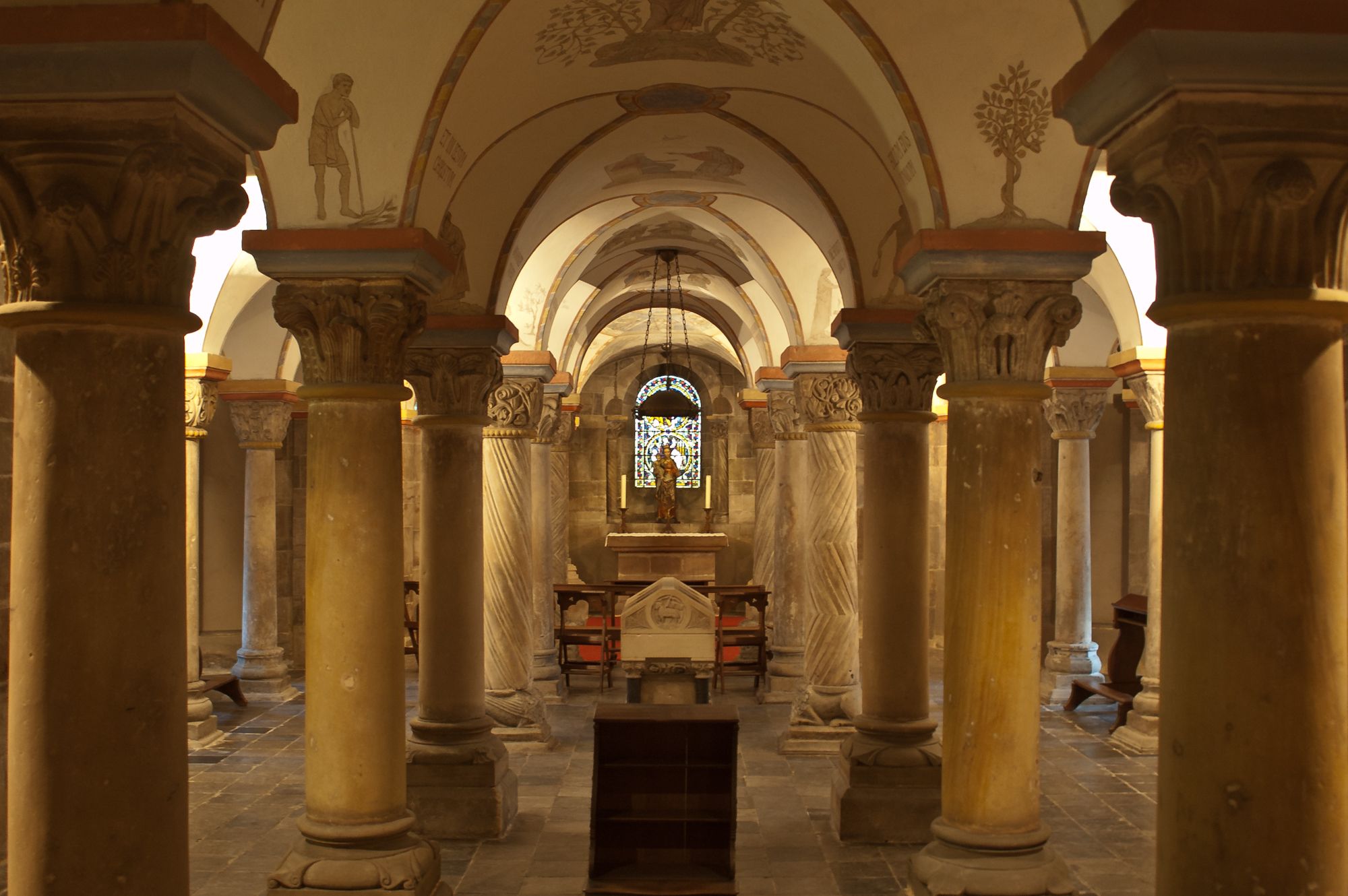
Crypt of Rolduc Abbey, Kerkrade Netherlands

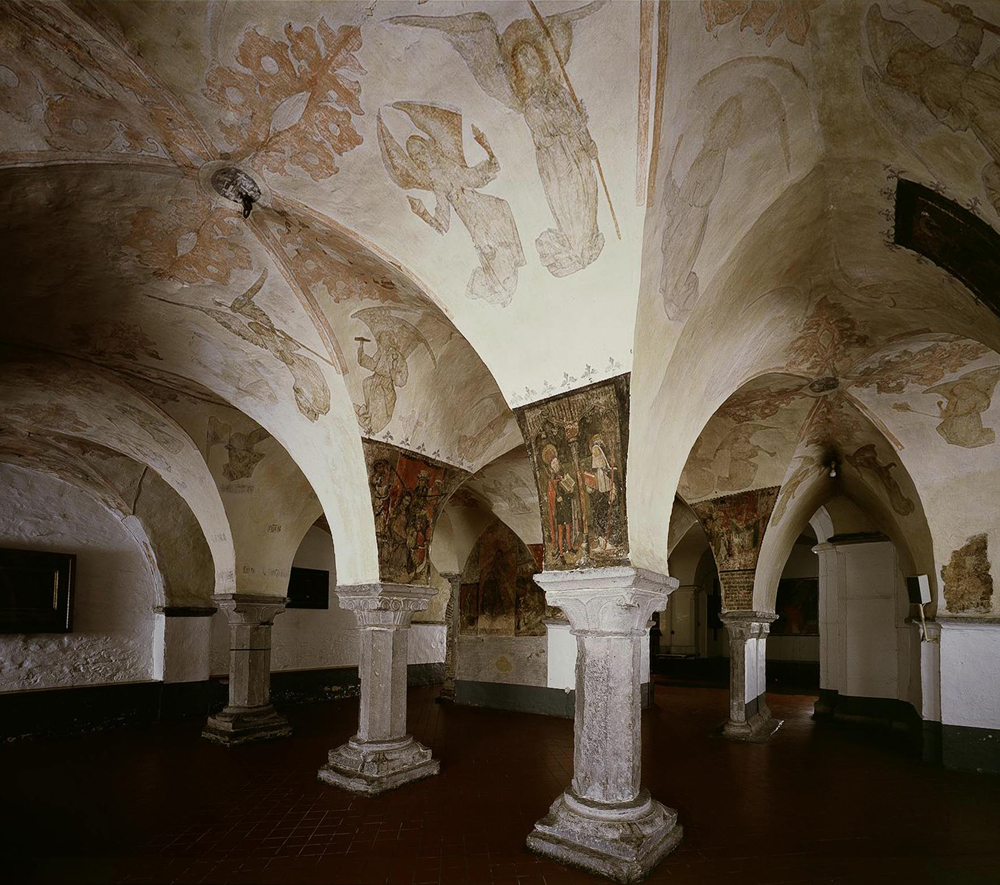
Crypt of St Bavo's Cathedral, Ghent, Belgium

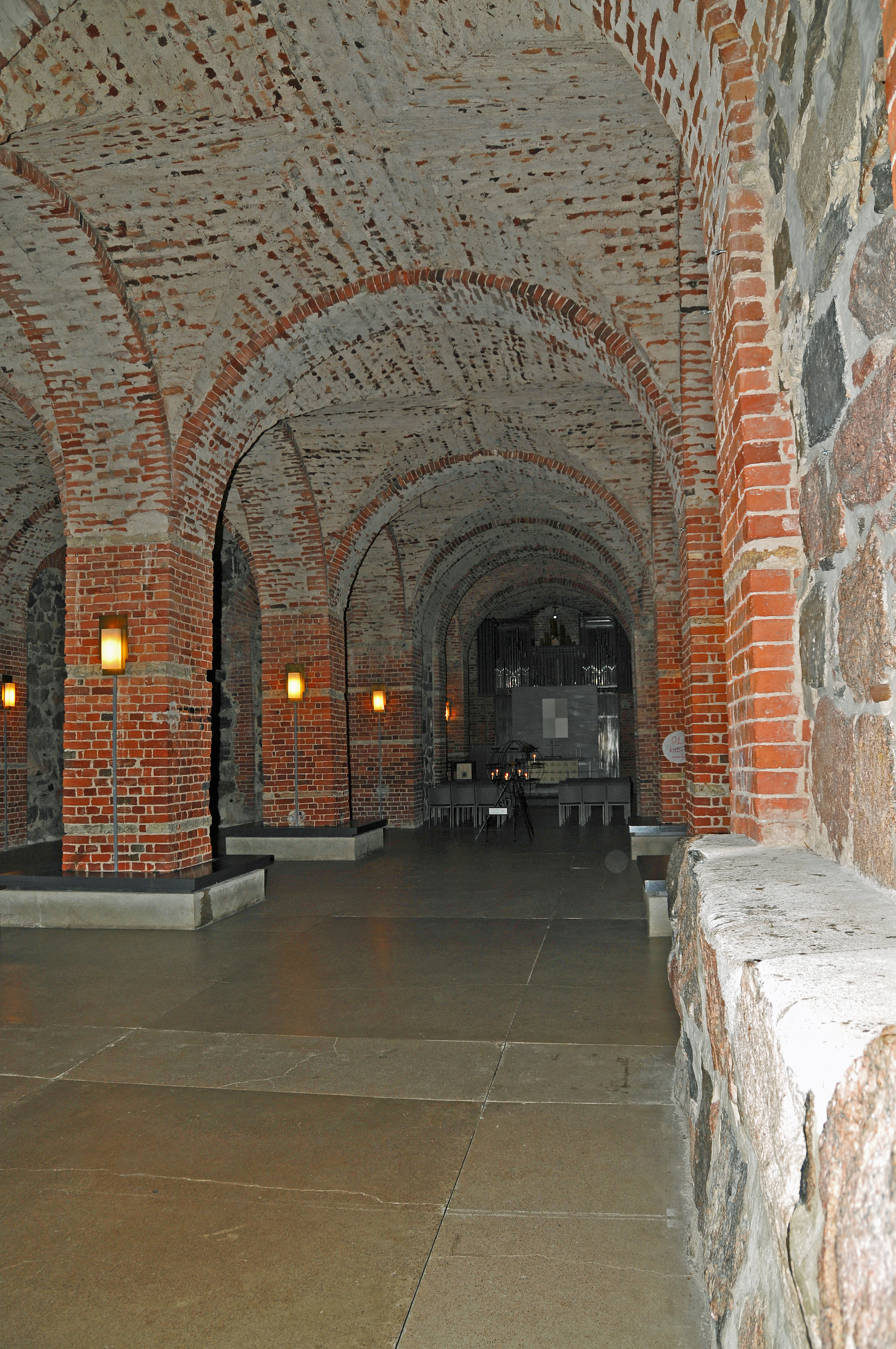
Crypt of Helsinki Cathedral, Finland

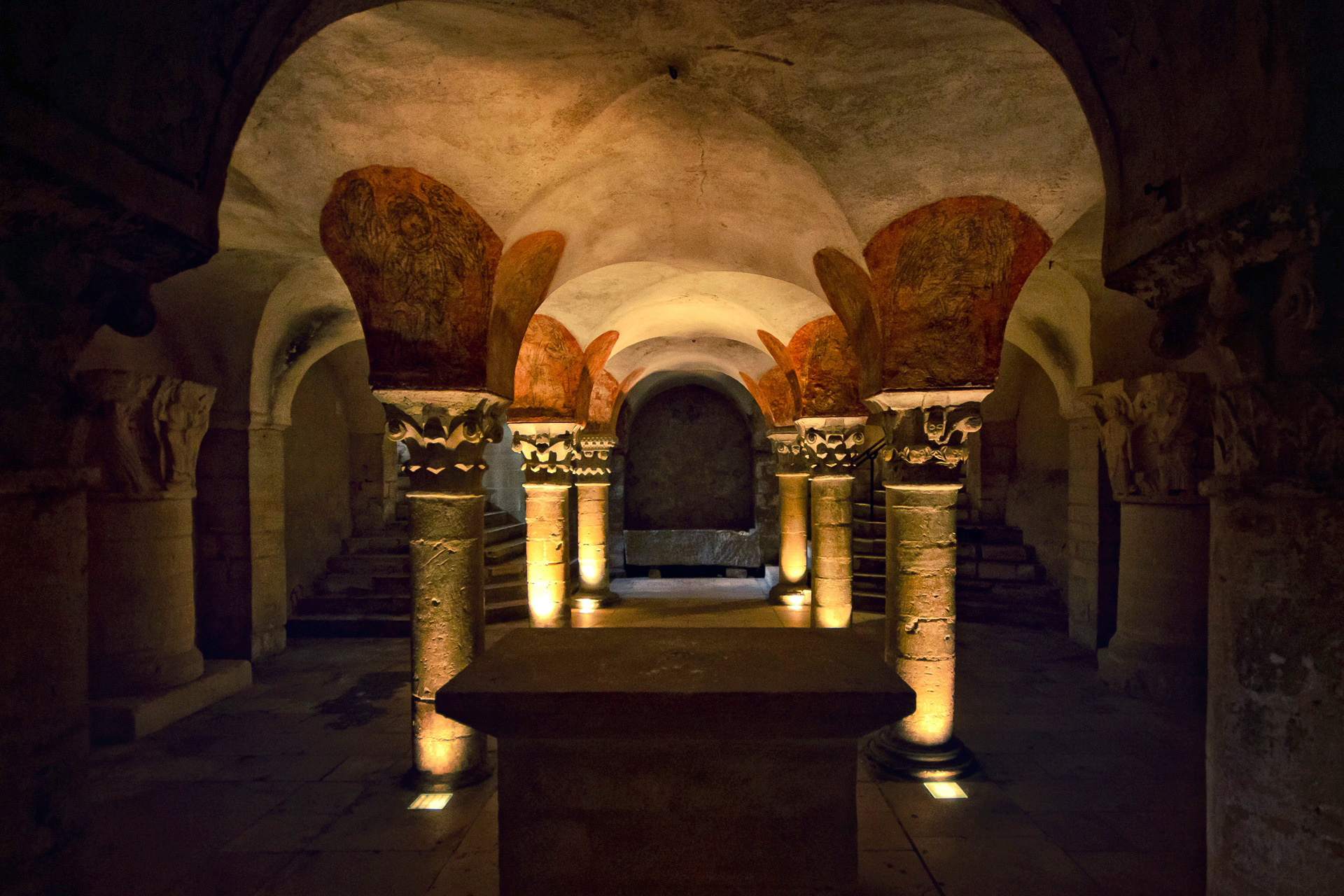
Crypt of Bayeux Cathedral, France

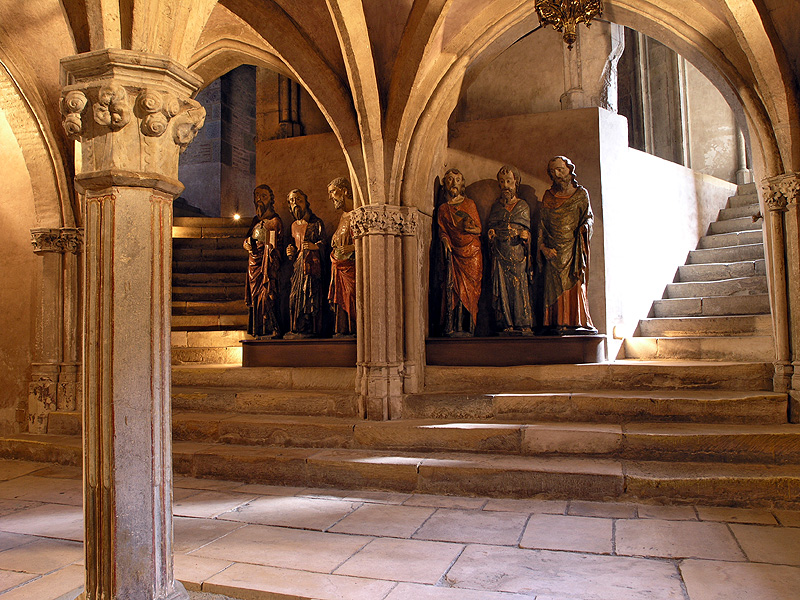
Crypt Saint-Sernin Basilica Toulouse

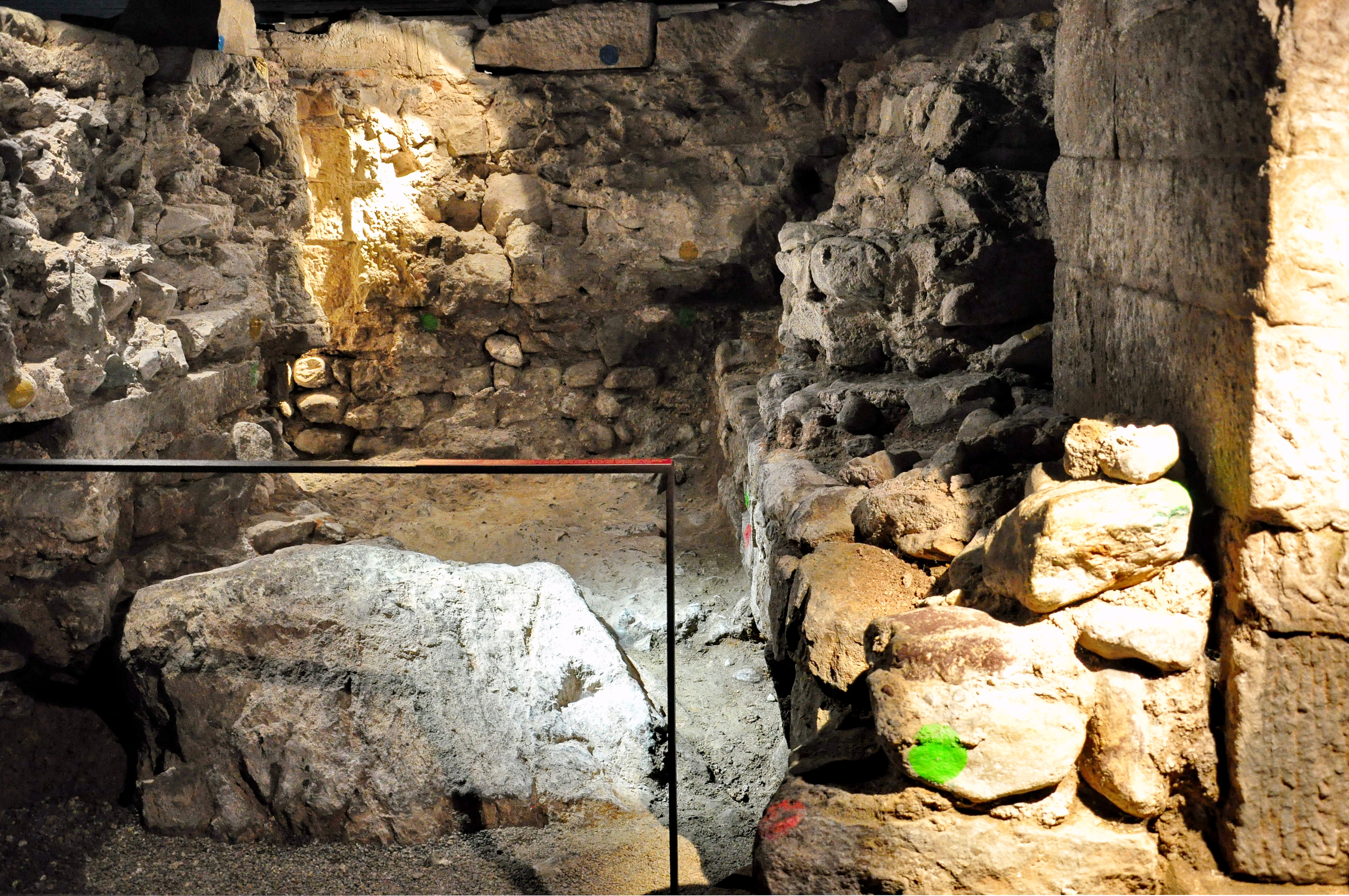
Wasserkirche, Zürich, with 'Martyr stone' of Felix and Regula

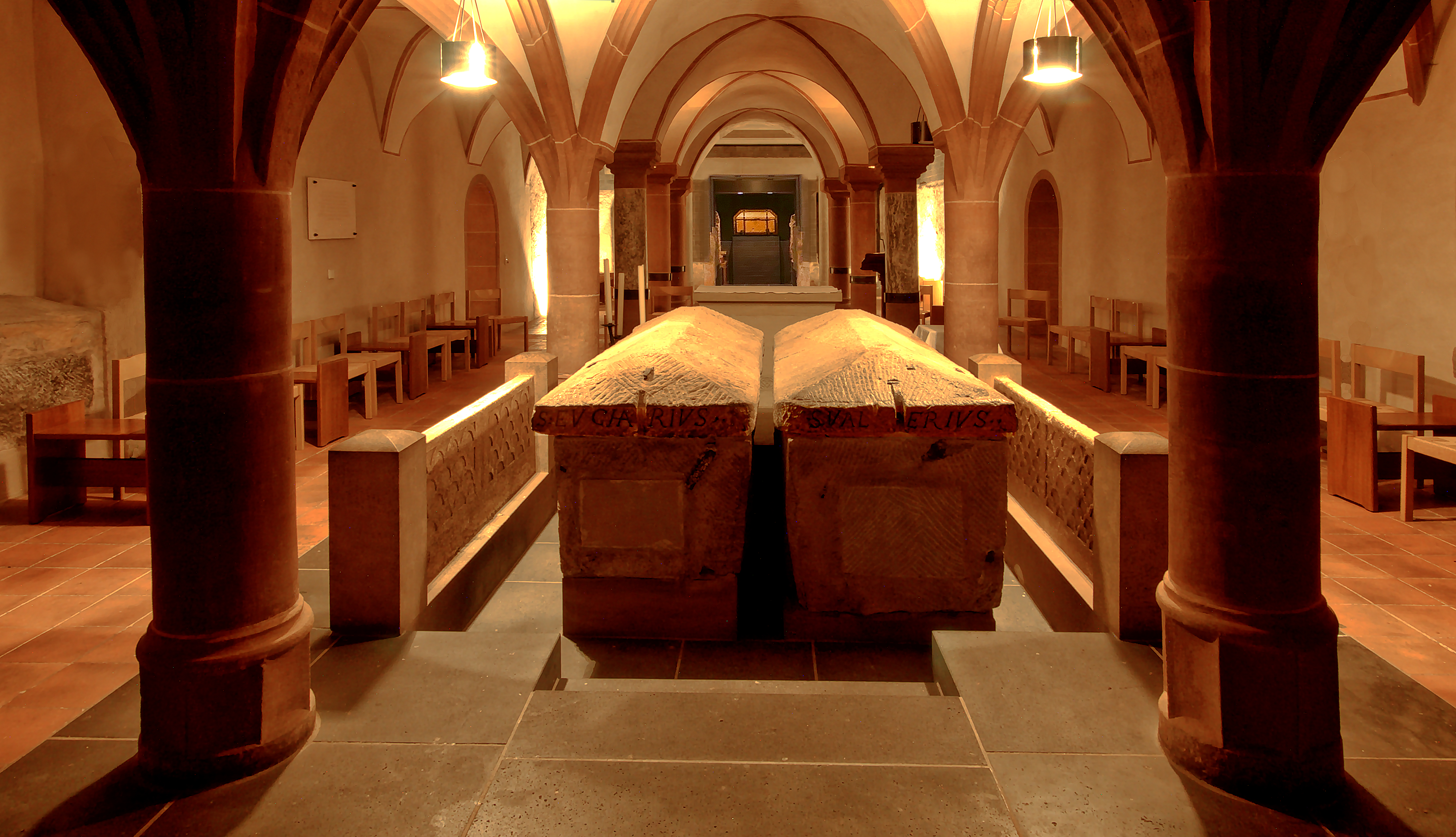
St. Matthias' Abbey, Trier, Germany

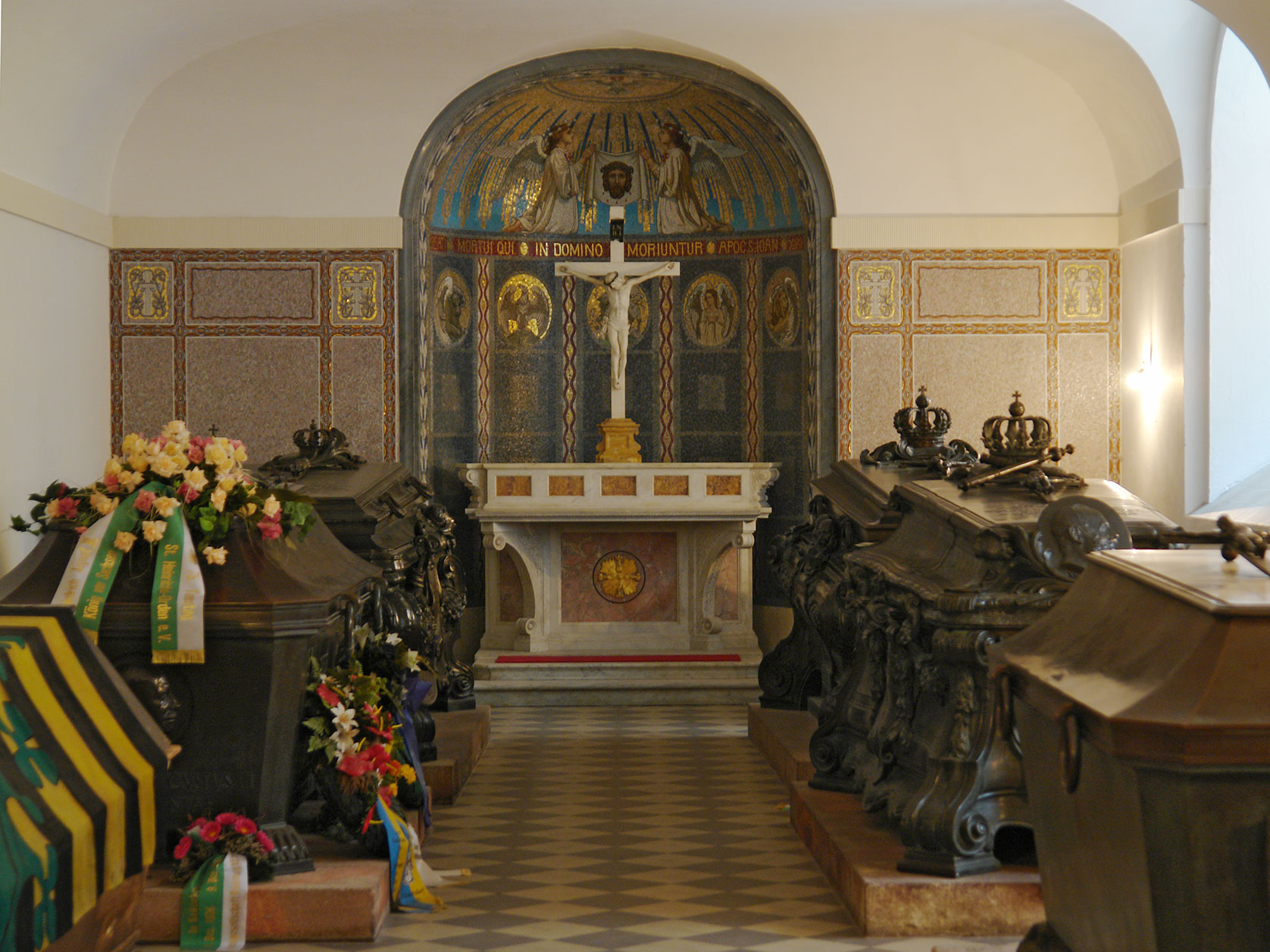
Wettin crypt in Katholische Hofkirche, Dresden

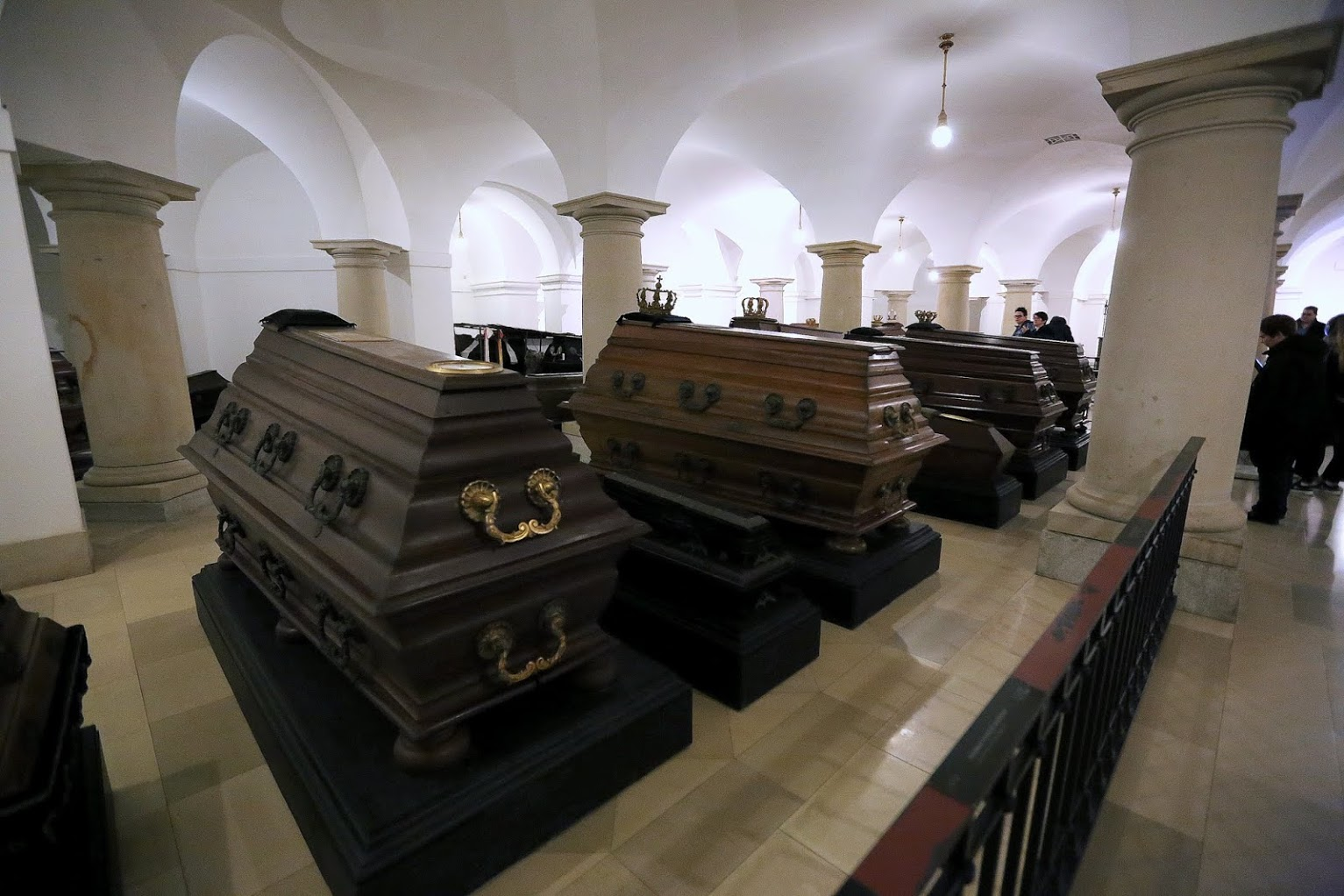
Hohenzollern crypt in Berlin Cathedral, Germany

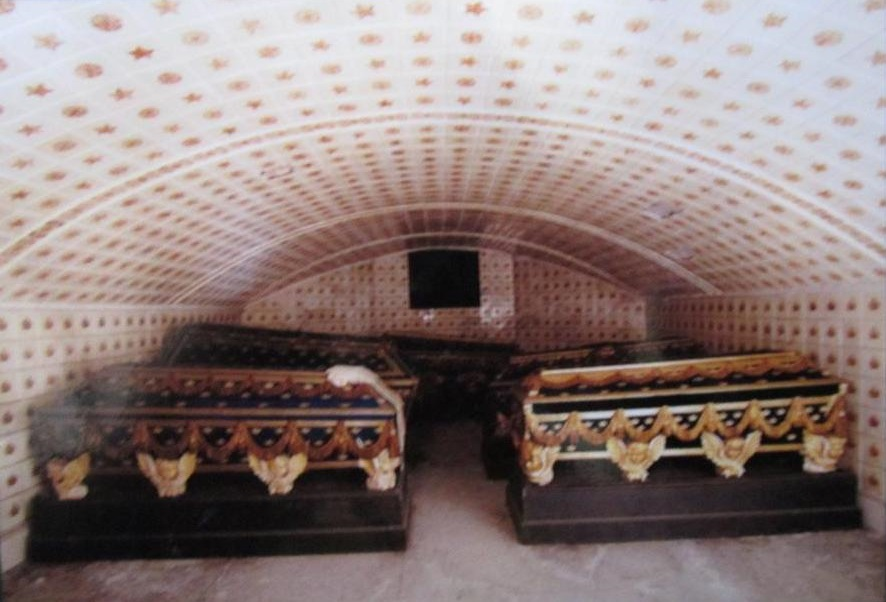
Crypt of Swedish royal dynasty (Bernadotte)

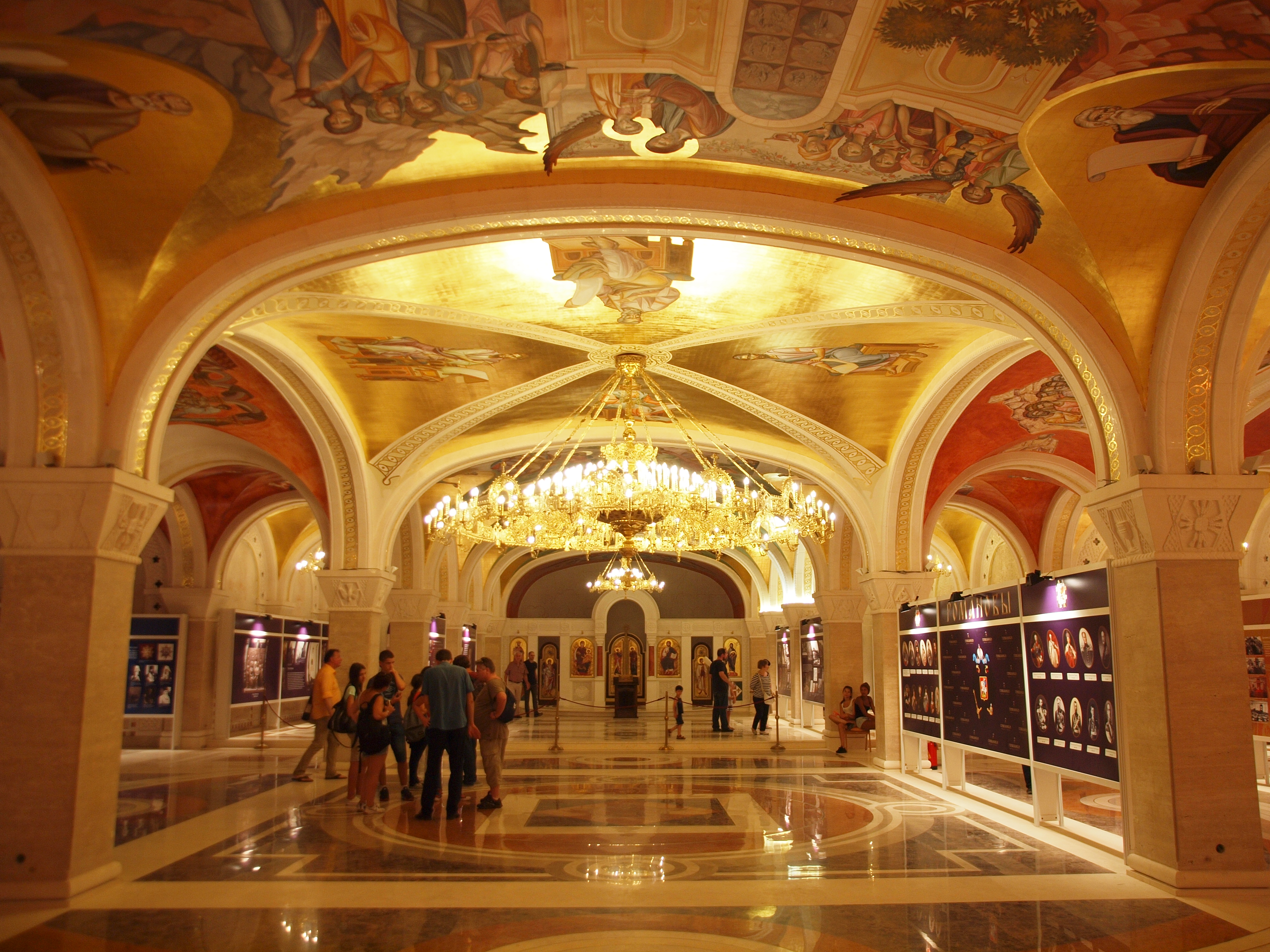
Crypt of Church of Saint Sava, Serbia

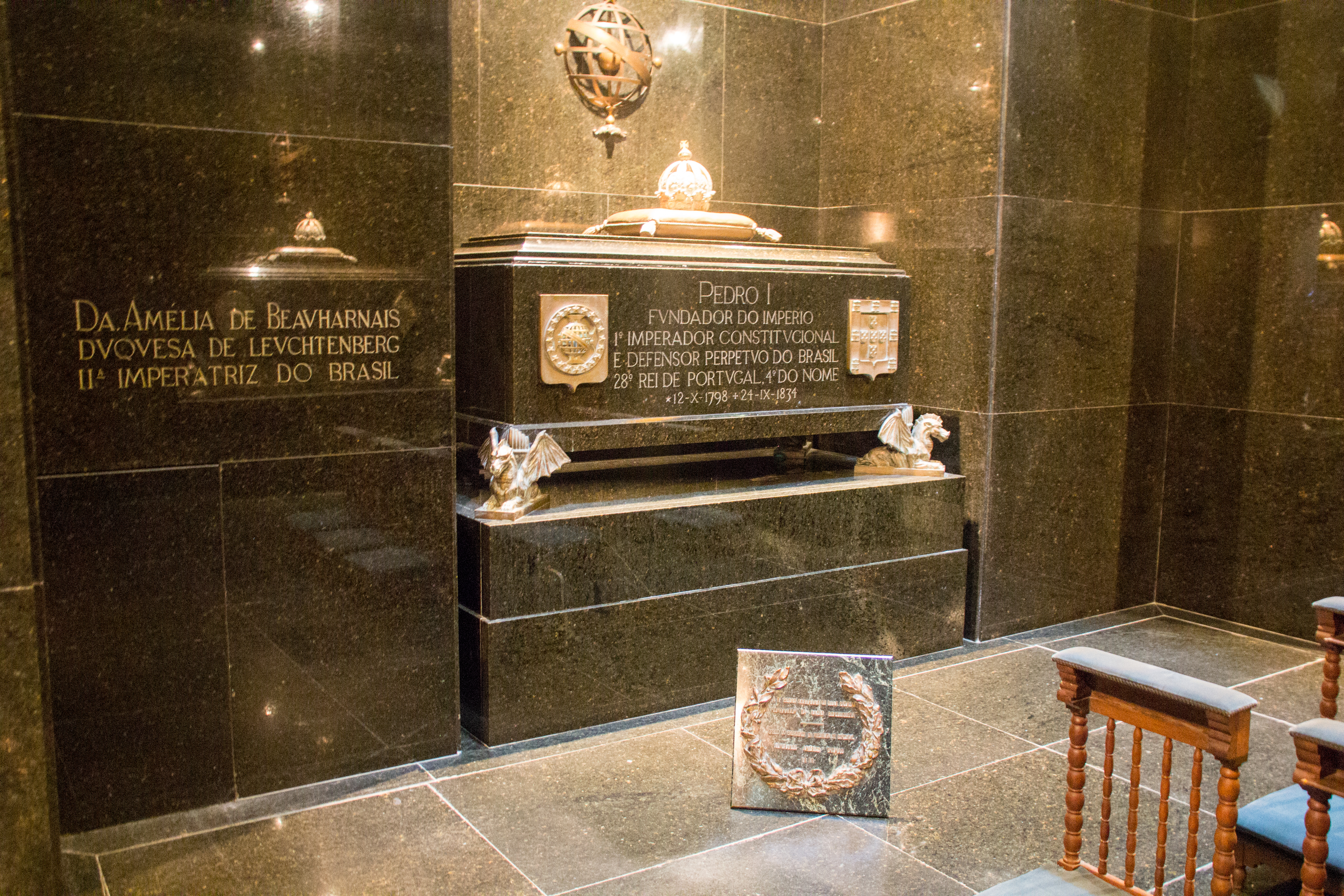
The Imperial Crypt and Chapel in the Monument to the Independence of Brazil, São Paulo

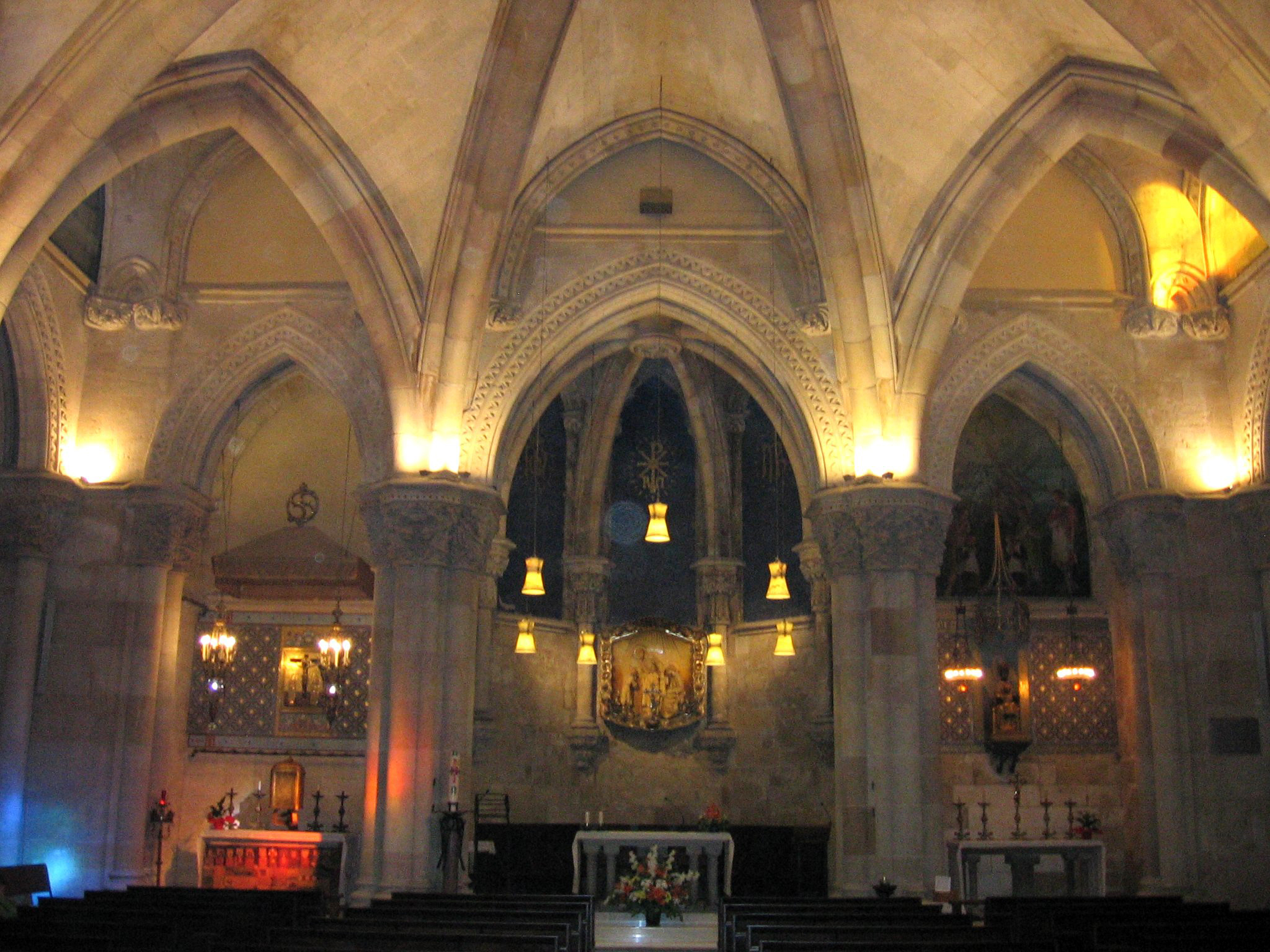
Crypt of Sagrada Familia, Barcelona, Spain

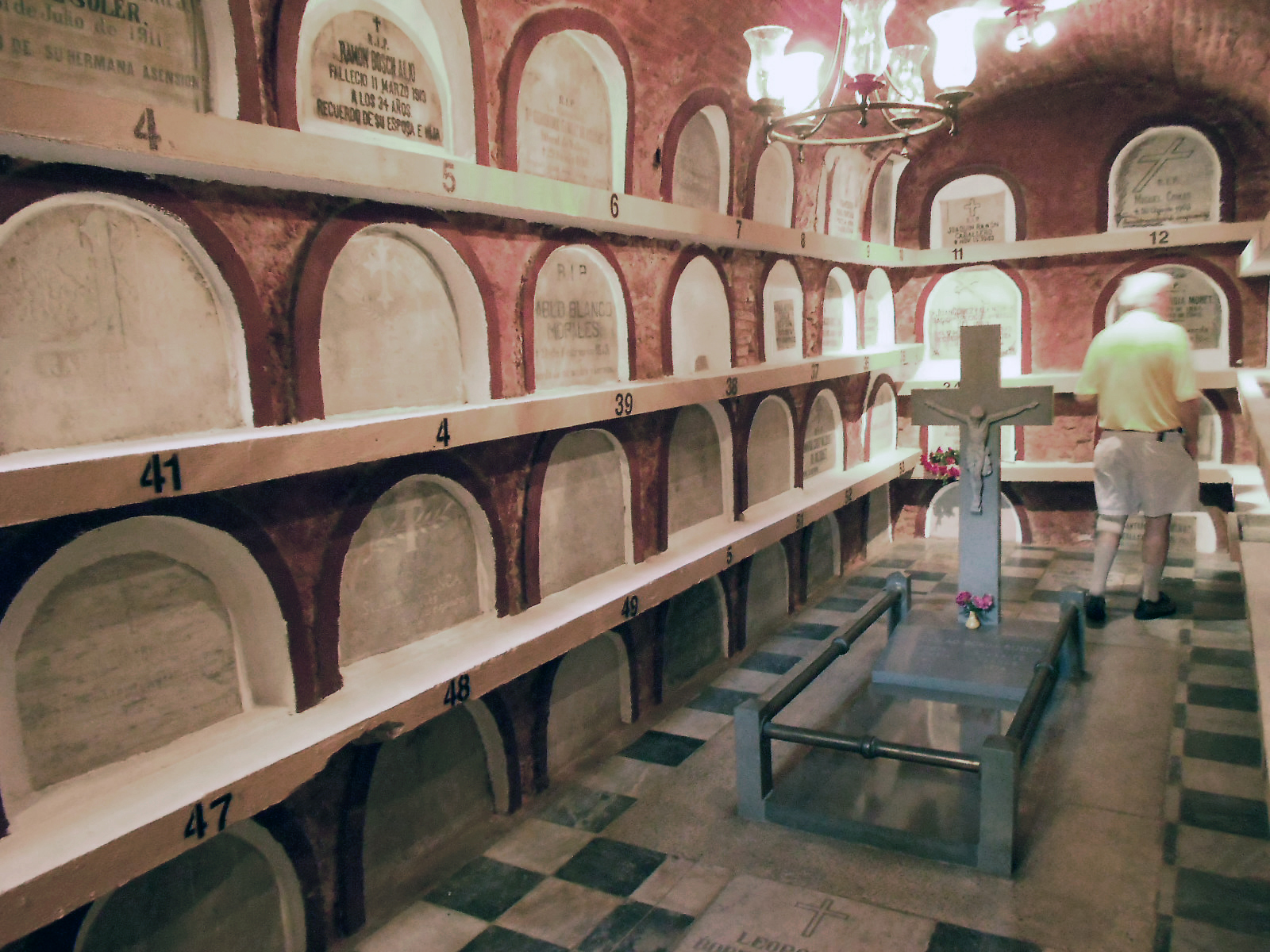
Crypt of Church of Saint Francis, Puerto Rico

== See also ==
- Burial vault (tomb)
- Catacomb
- Columbarium
- Ossuary
- Sarcophagus
- Tumulus
