= Gmina Adamów =

Gmina Adamów may refer to either of the following rural administrative districts in Lublin Voivodeship in eastern Poland:

- Gmina Adamów, Łuków County
- Gmina Adamów, Zamość County
