= History of the Jews in Adamów =

The Jewish history of Adamów at the Łuków County dates back as recent as 1827. By then, more than 100 Jews lived in town, meaning the Jewish community might existed long before. During the holocaust, the entire Jewish community of the town was annihilated, resulting in the disappearance of any Jewish existence in town ever since.

POL gmina Adamów flag

== History ==
By the end of the 19th century, more than 500 Jews lived in Adamów. Though the Jewish community kept good ties with the community of Łuków, it was put under the community of Kock. By then, the community had already owned a synagogue, a cemetery, a slaughterhouse and a mikveh. By the 1920s the Jewish community made up to 33% of the total population. During that time, Zionist parties held active branches in town.

=== Holocaust ===
After entering town on 20 September 1939, the German troops formed a Ghetto and a Judenrat was established. The first mass execution took place in November 1940, when 40 were shot dead in the local cemetery. Shortly after, a group of Jews from nearby Nasielsk were put in the Adamów Ghetto. On the winter of 1942/1943 a Typhoid fever stroke the ghetto. The deportations of the Adamów Ghetto Jews began in October 1942. Then, around 300 individuals, mostly elders, were shot to death in the suburbs of Adamów, in a meadow situated western to the church. All the rest 1,724 Jews living in the Ghetto were sent to the Lukow Ghetto. On the end of September 1942 a group of survivors from a mass killing of Jews in the nearby Serokomla and joined the Jews of the local ghetto. On September 4, 1942, all valuables were taken away from the Jews of the ghetto by Gestapo soldiers. Three and four days after, Ukarainian and Polish officers were in charge of sending the Jews of the Ghetto to Treblinka extermination camp. A small group of laborers stayed in the village until its closing in August 1943. Another group of forty Jews escaped the Adamów ghetto into the nearby forests, forming a partisan group which carried out attacks on local Nazi forces and Polish representatives.

== Demography ==
- 1827: 108 Jews lived in Adamów (18.4%).
- 1921: 664 Jews lived in Adamów (34.3%).

== Trade ==
During the history of the town Jewish community, and especially in the interwar period in the beginning of the 20th century, most of the grocery stores in Adamów were Jewish-owned. As a result, most of the Jews lived at the city center, which is no longer visible as it was back then because it was set on fire in 1943.

== Places ==
=== Synagogue ===
Because the synagogue was destroyed during World War II, not much is known about it. It is assumed, though, that it was erected during the 1890s. A Mikveh was also operated at the same time.

=== Cemetery ===
The Jewish cemetery of Adamow is located along the road to Wojcieszków village. No gravestones remain. A reconstruction project was held during 2001, clearing and fencing the area of the cemetery. A monument was also erected in its area.

=== Mass grave ===
No memorial was erected over the mass grave site although forty Jews were murdered in the cemetery in November 1940. In October 1942, the Jews were deported to the Lukow ghetto and then to Treblinka Concentration Camp.
