= Ferdynandów =

Ferdynandów may refer to the following places:

- Ferdynandów, Poddębice County in Łódź Voivodeship (central Poland)
- Ferdynandów, Radomsko County in Łódź Voivodeship (central Poland)
- Ferdynandów, Lublin Voivodeship (east Poland)
