= Budziska, Lublin Voivodeship =

Village in Lublin Voivodeship, Poland

Budziska
- Village
- Location within Poland
- Coordinates: 51°40′11″N 22°13′28″E
- Country: Poland
- Voivodeship: Lublin
- County: Łuków
- Gmina: Adamów
- Elevation: 162 m (531 ft)
- Population (2009): 233
- Time zone: UTC+1 (CET)
  - Summer (DST): UTC+2 (CEST)
- Postal code: 21-412
- Area code: +48 25
- Car plates: LLU

Budziska (Polish: [buˈd͡ʑiska]) is a village in the administrative district of Gmina Adamów, within Łuków County, Lublin Voivodeship, in eastern Poland.

In the Polish-Lithuanian Commonwealth it belonged to Stężyca Land in Sandomierz Voivodeship. In 1569 the village was a part of Łysobyki parish. According to a tax register from the 16th century, Stanisław Sobieski paid tax there for 14 half-łans and Jan Sobieski paid tax for 16 half-łans, one farmer and a folwark. By the end of the 19th century it had 29 houses and 259 inhabitants.
