= Władysławów, Łuków County =

Władysławów
- Village
- Location within Poland
- Coordinates: 51°40′39″N 22°14′47″E
- Country: Poland
- Voivodeship: Lublin
- County: Łuków
- Gmina: Adamów

Population
  - Total: 180

Władysławów [vwadɨˈswavuf] is a village in the administrative district of Gmina Adamów, within Łuków County, Lublin Voivodeship, in eastern Poland.
