= Wacław Jagas =

Polish military officer (1922–2018)

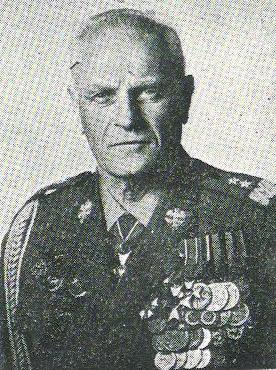

Chairman of the Council for the Protection of Struggle and Martyrdom Sites
- In office 1985–1985
- Preceded by: Stanisław Marcinkowski
- Succeeded by: Roman Paszkowski

Personal details
- Born: 22 December 1922 Congress Poland
- Died: 18 December 2018 (aged 95) Pabianice, Poland
- Education: Świerczewski General Staff Academy

Military service
- Allegiance: Polish People's Republic
- Branch/service: Polish People's Army
- Rank: Brigadier general

Wacław Jagas (22 December 1922 – 18 December 2018) was a Polish military officer of the Polish People's Army who served as the chairman of the Council for the Protection of Struggle and Martyrdom Sites.

== Biography ==
Son of Alfred and Róża, in 1940, he was deported to Siberia with his family, where he worked in taiga felling. In 1943, he was mobilized to the 1st Tadeusz Kościuszko Infantry Division. In August 1943, he graduated from the Cadet School of this division in Sielce nad Oką and, as a commander of a fusilier platoon, took part in the Battle of Lenino. He fought on the right wing of the divisional forces that had been introduced into action. Then, near Smolensk, he prepared non-commissioned officers for the newly formed 3rd Pomeranian Infantry Division. After graduating from the higher rifle school in Solnechnogorsk, Moscow Oblast he participated in organizational work on the formation of the 1st Motorized Infantry Brigade of the 1st Armoured Corps near Berdychiv, serving as commander of the 1st rifle company. During the offensive of the 2nd Polish Army on the Lusatian Neisse, he commanded a landing company on tanks - he took part in the crossing of the Neisse, participated in the battles of Bautzen and on the Spree up to Dresden. He completed his combat trail on the Elbe, and then participated in the liberation of the north-western part of Czechoslovakia.

After organizing a battalion to protect the border with Czechoslovakia, stationed near Głubczyce in 1946, as commander of the Border Protection Forces maneuver group (an independent horse-motorized battalion), he took part in battles with the Ukrainian Insurgent Army in the Baligród area.

After graduating from the Świerczewski General Staff Academy in 1951, he held a number of responsible command, staff and military school positions in the Polish Army. He was successively: commander of the 21st Infantry Division in Lidzbark Warmiński (1953–1955), chief of staff of the 8th Army Corps in Olsztyn, head of the Organizational Board of the General Staff of the Polish Army (1957–1965), deputy commander of the Warsaw Military District for line matters (1965–1969), military, naval and air attaché at the Polish People's Republic Embassy in Moscow (1969–1973), deputy commandant of the Polish Army General Staff Academy for line matters (1973–1978) and president of the mass paramilitary organization – the National Defense League (1978–1982). He was promoted to the rank of brigadier general in July 1960, and to the rank of division general in October 1974. In the years 1982–1986 he was deputy chief inspector of the Territorial Defense for training outside the army. At that time, he was the deputy of Lieutenant General Tadeusz Tuczapski. Since 1986, he was at the disposal of the Ministry of National Defense. On 30 March 1988, he was retired due to reaching retirement age (65 years of age).

He served in the Polish Armed Forces for 45 years, including 28 years in the rank of general.

A social activist. Long-time president of the Polish Association of Sports Shooting. In the years 1984–1985 – chairman of the Council for the Protection of Monuments of Combat and Martyrdom. From May 1985 to 1990, he was a member of the Presidium of the Main Board of the Union of Fighters and Democrats. In the years 1988–1990, he was a member of the Council for the Protection of Monuments of Combat and Martyrdom.

He died on 18 December 2018 and was buried at the Powązki Military Cemetery in Warsaw.

== Awards ==
- Commander's Cross of the Order of Polonia Restituta (1978)
- Officer's Cross of the Order of Polonia Restituta (1972)
- Knight's Cross of the Order of Polonia Restituta (1958)
- Order of the Banner of Labour, 1st class (1987)
- Order of the Banner of Labour, 2nd class (1963)
- Order of the Cross of Grunwald, 3rd class (1946)
- Golden Cross of Merit
- Cross of the Battle of Lenino
- Silver Medal "For Meritorious on the Field of Glory" (twice – 1943, 1945)
- Medal of the 10th Anniversary of People's Poland (1955)
- Medal of the 30th Anniversary of People's Poland (1974)
- Medal of the 40th Anniversary of People's Poland(1984)
- Medal of Victory and Freedom 1945
- Gold Medal of the Armed Forces in the Service of the Fatherland (1968)
- Silver Medal “Armed Forces in Service of the Homeland”
- Bronze Medal “Armed Forces in Service of the Homeland”
- Medal Medal for Participation in the Battle of Berlin
- Gold Medal of Merit for National Defence
- Silver Medal “For Merit to the Defence of the Country”
- Bronze Medal “For Merit to the Defence of the Country”
- Medal of the National Education Commission (1973)
- Meritorious Activist of Culture (1985)
- Golden Badge "For Care of Monuments" (1985)
- Golden Medal “For Merit to the National Defence League”
- Golden Medal "Guardian of National Remembrance"
- Badge of the 1000th Anniversary of the Polish State
- Grunwald Badge
- Kościuszko Badge
- Golden Badge of Honour "For Merits for Warsaw" (1962)
- Medal "For Long-Term, Devoted Service" (awarded by the Minister of National Defense, 1988)
- Commemorative Medal "For Merits for the Warsaw Military District"
- Czechoslovak War Cross 1939–1945 (Czechoslovakia, 1946)
- Order of the Red Banner (Soviet Union)
- Order of Friendship of Peoples (Soviet Union, 1973)
- Medal "For Strengthening of Brotherhood in Arms" (Soviet Union, 1984)
- Medal "For the Victory over Germany in the Great Patriotic War 1941–1945" (Soviet Union)
- Jubilee Medal "Twenty Years of Victory in the Great Patriotic War 1941–1945" (Soviet Union)
- Badge "25th Anniversary of Victory in the Great Patriotic War of 1941–1945” (Soviet Union, 1970)
- Jubilee Medal "Thirty Years of Victory in the Great Patriotic War 1941–1945" (Soviet Union, 1975)
- Jubilee Medal "Forty Years of Victory in the Great Patriotic War 1941–1945" (Soviet Union, 1985)
- Jubilee Medal "60 Years of the Armed Forces of the USSR" (Soviet Union)
- Entry in the Honorary Book of Military Deeds (1985)
