= Zakępie, Lublin Voivodeship =

Zakępie
- Village
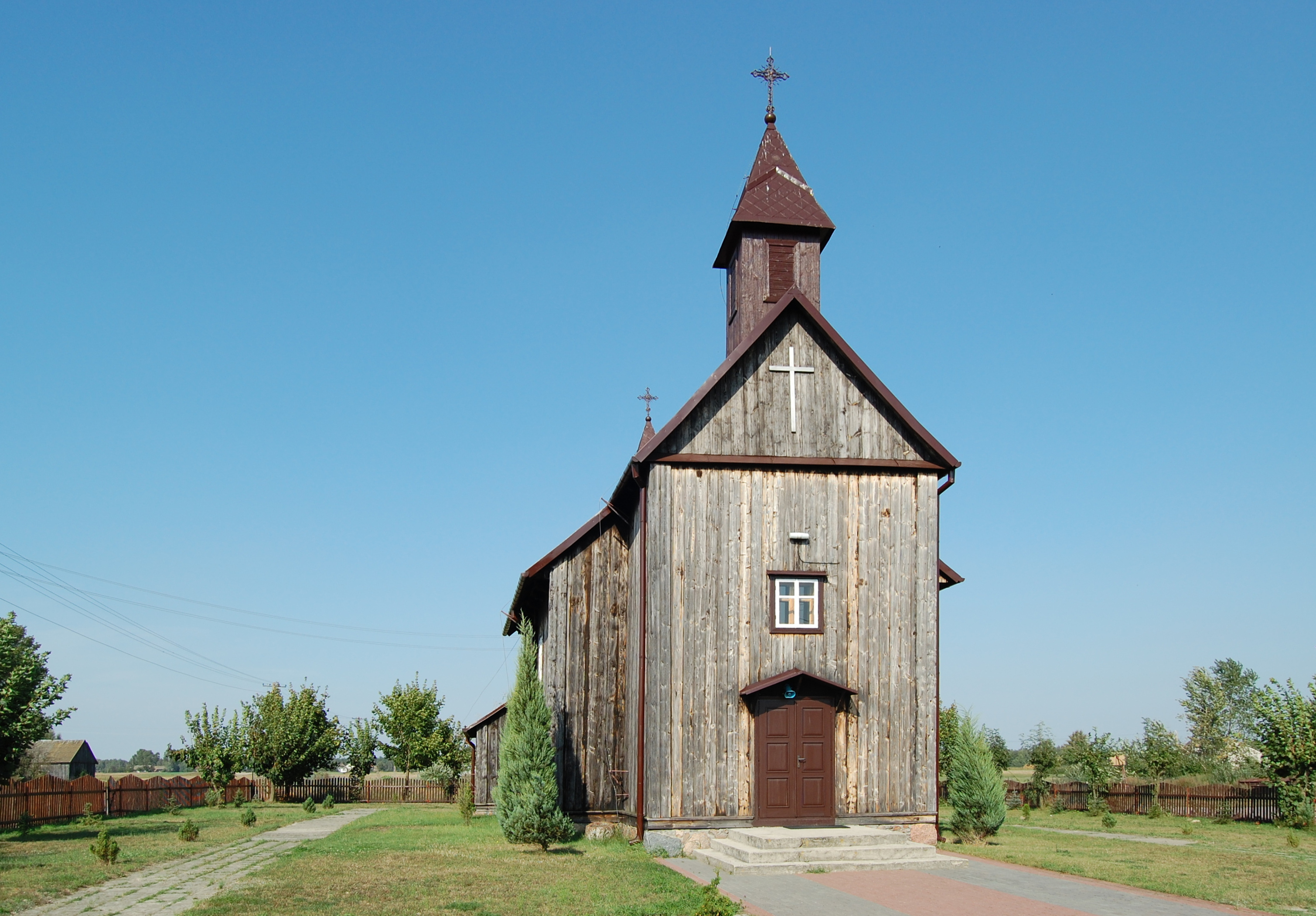
- Church in Zakępie

- Location within Poland
- Coordinates: 51°43′15″N 22°17′41″E
- Country: Poland
- Voivodeship: Lublin
- County: Łuków
- Gmina: Adamów

Population
  - Total: 410

Zakępie [zaˈkɛmpjɛ] is a village in the administrative district of Gmina Adamów, within Łuków County, Lublin Voivodeship, in eastern Poland.
