= Sobiska =

- Village
- Location within Poland
- Coordinates: 51°42′N 22°15′E
- Country: Poland
- Voivodeship: Lublin
- County: Łuków
- Gmina: Adamów

Sobiska [sɔˈbiska] is a village in the administrative district of Gmina Adamów, within Łuków County, Lublin Voivodeship, in eastern Poland.
