= Hordzieżka =

- Village
- Location within Poland
- Coordinates: 51°45′N 22°12′E
- Country: Poland
- Voivodeship: Lublin
- County: Łuków
- Gmina: Adamów

Hordzieżka [xɔrˈd͡ʑɛʂka] is a village in the administrative district of Gmina Adamów, within Łuków County, Lublin Voivodeship, in eastern Poland.
