= Kalinowy Dół =

- Village
- Location within Poland
- Coordinates: 51°39′51″N 22°10′49″E
- Country: Poland
- Voivodeship: Lublin
- County: Łuków
- Gmina: Adamów

Population
  - Total: 70

Kalinowy Dół (Polish pronunciation: [kaliˈnɔvɨ ˈduw]) is a village in the administrative district of Gmina Adamów, within Łuków County, Lublin Voivodeship, in eastern Poland.
