= Żurawiec, Lublin Voivodeship =

Żurawiec
- Village
- Location within Poland
- Coordinates: 51°40′59″N 22°11′2″E
- Country: Poland
- Voivodeship: Lublin
- County: Łuków
- Gmina: Adamów

Population
  - Total: 320

Żurawiec [ʐuˈravjɛt͡s] is a village in the administrative district of Gmina Adamów in Łuków County, Lublin Voivodeship. in eastern Poland.

== Population ==
The population of Żurawiec in 2021 was reported to be 267.
