= Lipiny, Łuków County =

Lipiny
- Village
- Location within Poland
- Coordinates: 51°42′26″N 22°9′28″E
- Country: Poland
- Voivodeship: Lublin
- County: Łuków
- Gmina: Adamów

Population
  - Total: 340
- Time zone: UTC+1 (CET)
  - Summer (DST): UTC+2 (CEST)

Lipiny [liˈpinɨ] is a village in the administrative district of Gmina Adamów, within Łuków County, Lublin Voivodeship, in eastern Poland.

== History ==
Eight Polish citizens were murdered by Nazi Germany in the village during World War II.
