= Dąbrówka, Łuków County =

Dąbrówka
- Village
- Location within Poland
- Coordinates: 51°40′52″N 22°11′51″E
- Country: Poland
- Voivodeship: Lublin
- County: Łuków
- Gmina: Adamów

Population
  - Total: 190

Dąbrówka [dɔmˈbrufka] is a village in the administrative district of Gmina Adamów, within Łuków County, Lublin Voivodeship, in eastern Poland.
