= Wola Gułowska =

Village in Lublin Voivodeship, Poland

- Village
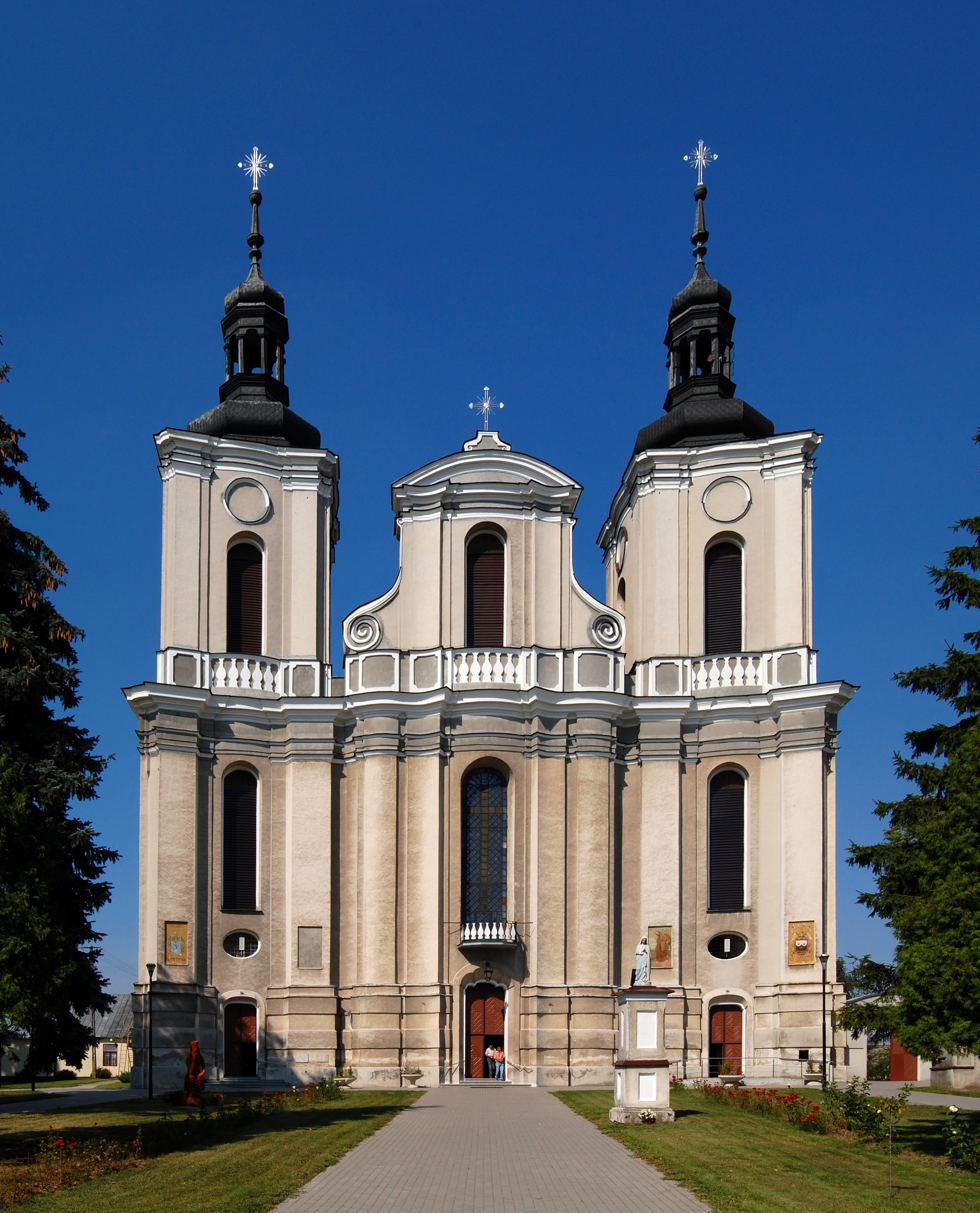
- Church of the Visitation in Wola Gułowska

- Location within Poland
- Coordinates: 51°42′1″N 22°12′41″E
- Country: Poland
- Voivodeship: Lublin
- County: Łuków
- Gmina: Adamów
- Elevation: 165 m (541 ft)
- Population: 328
- Time zone: UTC+1 (CET)
  - Summer (DST): UTC+2 (CEST)
- Postal code: 21-412
- Area code: +48 25
- Car plates: LLU

Wola Gułowska (Polish: [ˈvɔla ɡuˈwɔfska]) is a village in the administrative district of Gmina Adamów, within Łuków County, Lublin Voivodeship, in eastern Poland.

Wola Gułowska is located on the Czarna river, a small tributary of the Tyśmienica river. The valley of the Czarna river is a notable geographical feature of the village. It is located on the edge of the Żelechów upland, near the Łuków plain. The village has a baroque Church of the Visitation.

== History ==
Historically, Wola Gułowska belongs to the Stężyca Land in the Sandomierz Voivodeship. The oldest reference to Wola Gułowska is from 1508 when it was mentioned in a record next to Gułów. Records show that in 1509, along with Adamów, it belonged to the Wojcieszków parish. In 1545 Hieronim Rusiecki, the Sandomierz Standard-bearer, built a wooden chapel and paid for the upkeep of a priest in the village. In 1633 Ludwik Krasiński, heir to the local property, decided to found a Carmelite monastery and build a new church next to the old wooden chapel. The construction was completed and the church was consecrated in 1782. On 11 April 1869 the church was made the seat of a new parish.

From 3 to 5 October 1939, Wola Gułowska was the site of one of the smaller battles fought during the Battle of Kock. Polish soldiers fought against German troops near the village's cemetery and a local airfield. After the war a shrine and a museum dedicated to the battle were erected in the village. Between the years 1975 and 1998 the area administratively belonged to the Siedlce Voivodeship.
