= Helenów, Gmina Adamów =

Helenów
- Village
- Location within Poland
- Coordinates: 51°41′16″N 22°11′25″E
- Country: Poland
- Voivodeship: Lublin
- County: Łuków
- Gmina: Adamów

Population
  - Total: 100

Helenów [xɛˈlɛnuf] is a village in the administrative district of Gmina Adamów, within Łuków County, Lublin Voivodeship, in eastern Poland.
