= Turzystwo =

- Village
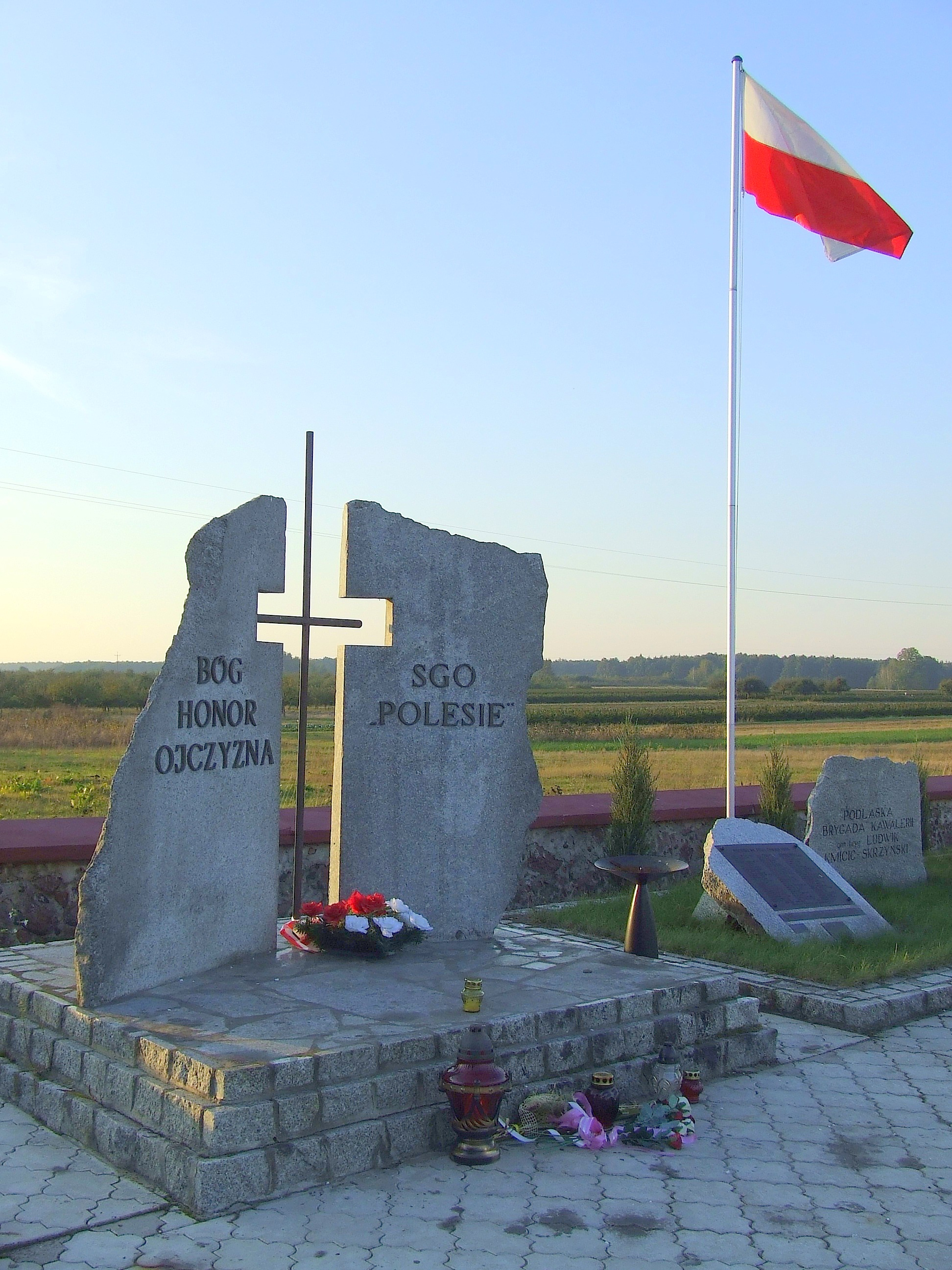
- Cemetery in the village

- Location within Poland
- Coordinates: 51°42′15″N 22°11′13″E
- Country: Poland
- Voivodeship: Lublin
- County: Łuków
- Gmina: Adamów

Population
  - Total: 410

Turzystwo [tuˈʐɨstfɔ] is a village in the administrative district of Gmina Adamów, within Łuków County, Lublin Voivodeship, in eastern Poland.
