= Council for the Protection of Struggle and Martyrdom Sites =

Polish government body

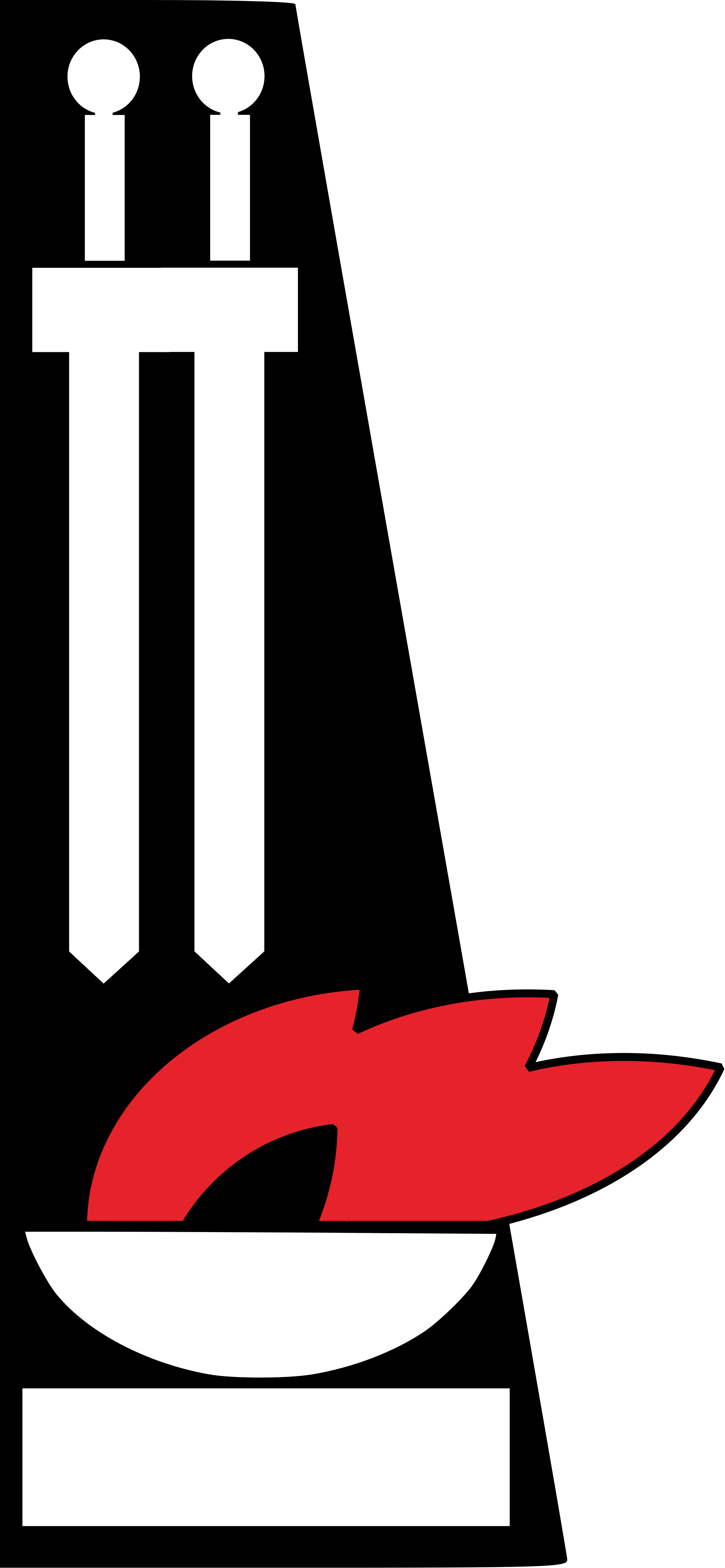

The Council for the Protection of Struggle and Martyrdom Sites (Polish: Rada Ochrony Pamięci Walk i Męczeństwa) was a Polish government body charged with the preservation of historical sites of wartime persecution of the Polish nation. It was set up by Act of Parliament on 2 July 1947 and, since 1988, is under the direct responsibility of the Prime Minister's Office.

== Aims and objectives ==
The Council's tasks include providing logistical help to museums of fight and martyrdom and offering consultation and advice to leading Polish museums of World War II in particular Auschwitz-Birkenau, Majdanek, Treblinka, Stutthof, Stalag Łambinowice, Żabikowo Fort VII, Gross-Rosen in Rogoźnica, and Radogoszcz station and museum. The Council is responsible for scheduling and organizing celebrations, exhibitions and publishing projects, as well as popularizing in mass media the historical facts, figures and notable persons associated with the struggle for freedom and wartime martyrdom of the nation. The Council is also in charge of assessing the current state of the sites of national memory, the public monuments, cemeteries, and mass graves of victims of Nazi and Soviet terror, and places of battles, including their commemoration initiatives.

== Chairmen of the Council ==
Members of the Council are appointed by the Prime Minister for four-year terms.

- 1947–1953 – Zygmunt Balicki
- 1954–1960 – Kazimierz Banach
- 1960–1981 – Janusz Wieczorek
- 1982–1983 – Stanisław Marcinkowski
- 1984–1985 – Wacław Jagas
- 1985–1990 – Roman Paszkowski
- 1990–2000 – Stanisław Broniewski
- 2001–2015 – Władysław Bartoszewski
- 2016 – Anna Maria Anders

== See also ==
- Office for War Veterans and Victims of Oppression
