= Ferdynandów, Lublin Voivodeship =

Ferdynandów
- Village
- Location within Poland
- Coordinates: 51°39′47″N 22°12′25″E
- Country: Poland
- Voivodeship: Lublin
- County: Łuków
- Gmina: Adamów

Population
  - Total: 200

Ferdynandów [fɛrdɨˈnanduf] is a village in the administrative district of Gmina Adamów, within Łuków County, Lublin Voivodeship, in eastern Poland.
