= Gmina Adamów, Łuków County =

Gmina Adamów Adamów Commune
- Gmina
- Flag Coat of arms

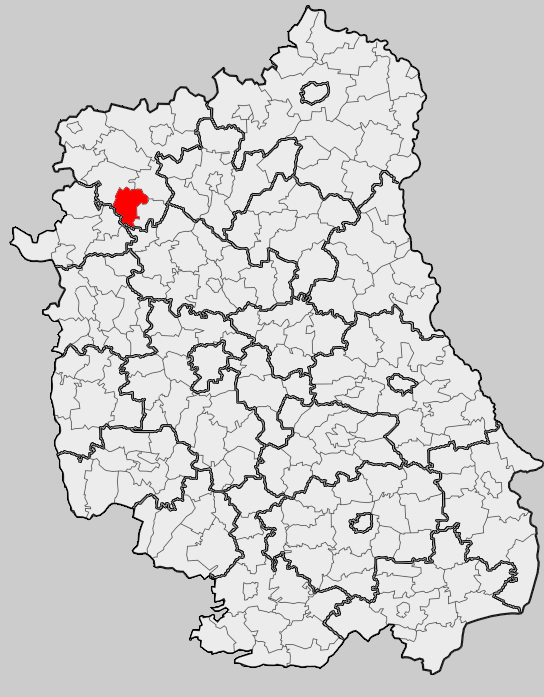
- Location within the county and voivodeship
- Coordinates (Adamów): 51°45′N 22°15′E
- Country: Poland
- Voivodeship: Lublin
- County: Łuków
- Seat: Adamów

Government
  - wójt: Karol Ponikowski (PiS)

Area
  - Total: 98.7 km^{2} (38.1 sq mi)

Population (2020)
  - Total: 5,511
  - Density: 55.8/km^{2} (145/sq mi)
- Time zone: UTC+1 (CET)
  - Summer (DST): UTC+2 (CEST)
- Postal code: 21-412
- Area code: +48 25
- Car plates: LLU
- Website: http://www.adamow.pl/

Gmina Adamów is a rural gmina (administrative district) in Łuków County, Lublin Voivodeship, in eastern Poland. Its seat is the village of Adamów, which lies approximately 21 kilometres (13 mi) south-west of Łuków and 60 km (37 mi) north of the regional capital Lublin.

The gmina covers an area of 98.89 square kilometres (38.2 sq mi), and as of 2006 its total population is 5,801.

== Neighbouring gminas ==
Gmina Adamów is bordered by the gminas of Jeziorzany, Krzywda, Nowodwór, Serokomla, Ułęż and Wojcieszków.

== Villages ==
The gmina contains the following villages with the status of sołectwo: Adamów (divided into 2 sołectwos: Adamów I and Adamów II), Budziska, Dąbrówka, Ferdynandów, Gułów, Helenów, Hordzieżka, Kalinowy Dół, Konorzatka, Lipiny, Sobiska, Turzystwo, Władysławów, Wola Gułowska, Zakępie and Żurawiec.

There is one village without sołectwo status: Natalin, which belongs to the sołectwo of Żurawiec.

== See also ==
- Gmina Adamów, Zamość County
