= Natalin, Łuków County =

Natalin
- Village
- Location within Poland
- Coordinates: 51°40′44″N 22°10′30″E
- Country: Poland
- Voivodeship: Lublin
- County: Łuków
- Gmina: Adamów

Population
  - Total: 100

Natalin [naˈtalin] is a village in the administrative district of Gmina Adamów, within Łuków County, Lublin Voivodeship, in eastern Poland.
