= Adamów, Łuków County =

Adamów
- Village
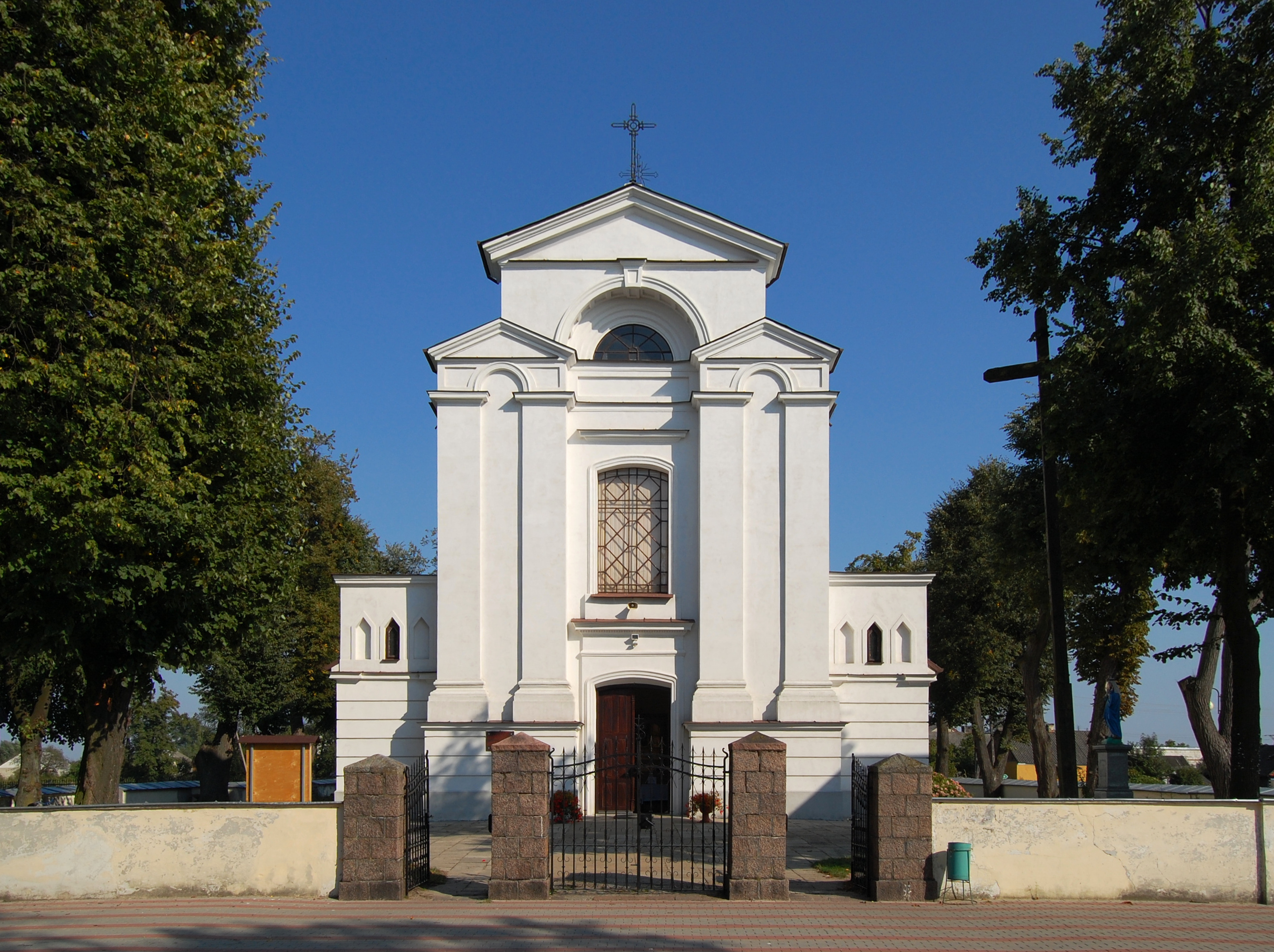
- Church in Adamów

- Location within Poland
- Coordinates: 51°45′N 22°15′E
- Country: Poland
- Voivodeship: Lublin
- County: Łuków
- Gmina: Adamów

Population
  - Total: 2,100

Adamów [aˈdamuf] is a village in Łuków County, Lublin Voivodeship, in eastern Poland. It is the seat of the gmina (administrative district) called Gmina Adamów.

In 2005, the village had a population of 2,100. It is divided into two sołectwos: Adamów I and Adamów II. Formerly, between 1539 and 1870, Adamów had the status of a town. Next to the village flows the Motwica river. Adamów is the seat of a Roman Catholic parish of Holy Cross.

== History ==
The history of Adamów dates back to the year 1539, when King Sigismund I the Old issued a charter to a town called Jadaromin, whose name was later changed to Adamów. At that time, it belonged to the brothers Adam and Hieronim Rusiecki, who in 1545 founded here a parish church. In 1569, during the Polish Golden Age, Adamów had a population of 415, and by 1576, the population grew to approximately 700. Until the Partitions of Poland, Adamów was part of the Land of Stezyca, Sandomierz Voivodeship. In 1795–1807 it was part of the Habsburg Empire, and in 1815–1915, it belonged to the Russian-controlled Congress Poland. Following the January Uprising, Adamów was stripped of town charter (1869). At that time, its population was app. 1,000, with 90 houses. The village remained in private hands, and in 1869, its gmina was moved to nearby Gulow, to return to Adamów in 1880.

In early October 1939, during the German Invasion of Poland, the area of Adamow saw fighting between the Polish Army and the Wehrmacht, in the Battle of Kock. In 1943, most of the village burned in a fire.

== Jewish history ==
Jews lived in Adamów since the 19th century. In the turn of the 20th century, they consisted about 30% of the total population and maintained their own synagogue, cemetery, school and branches of different Jewish-political movements. During the holocaust a ghetto was formed, inhabiting the town Jews, with other Jews from nearby villages, along one street in the town. The first execution was held by the Nazi's in November 1940, outside the local cemetery. By 1943, around 1700 Jews lived in the ghetto. They were deported to Treblinka extermination camp in October 1942. The local synagogue was burnt and it is not evident ever since. The Jewish cemetery, though, was renovated in 2001 and can still be visited.
