= Gułów, Lublin Voivodeship =

Gułów
- Village
- Location within Poland
- Coordinates: 51°44′35″N 22°13′28″E
- Country: Poland
- Voivodeship: Lublin
- County: Łuków
- Gmina: Adamów

Population
  - Total: 530

Gułów [ˈɡuwuf] is a village in the administrative district of Gmina Adamów, within Łuków County, Lublin Voivodeship, in eastern Poland.
