= Antoni Wodziński =

Polish writer and translator (1848–1928)

Antoni Wodziński (September 30, 1848; Śmiłowice – October 22, 1928; Służewo) was a Polish nobleman and a writer in both Polish and French.

He was a representative of the Kuyavian branch of the Wodziński family, the nephew of painter and pianist Maria Wodzińska (fiancée of Frédéric Chopin), and cousin of the senator and president of the Senate, Maciej Wodziński.

== Biography ==
He was the fourth child of Feliks Wodziński and Łucja Wolicka, and the grandson of Wincenty. In his youth, he moved to France, where he attended law lectures at the Sorbonne in Paris. He became highly proficient in French and wrote primarily in that language.

He is known as the first translator of Henryk Sienkiewicz's works into French. He translated most of Sienkiewicz's works, including Without Dogma, The Polaniecki Family, With Fire and Sword, The Deluge, and Pan Michael (the last three in collaboration with Ludwik Kozakiewicz).

His own works include Les trois romans de Frédéric Chopin (1886), several French novels, and, in Polish, Letters from Paris, published in Słowo (1882–1883).

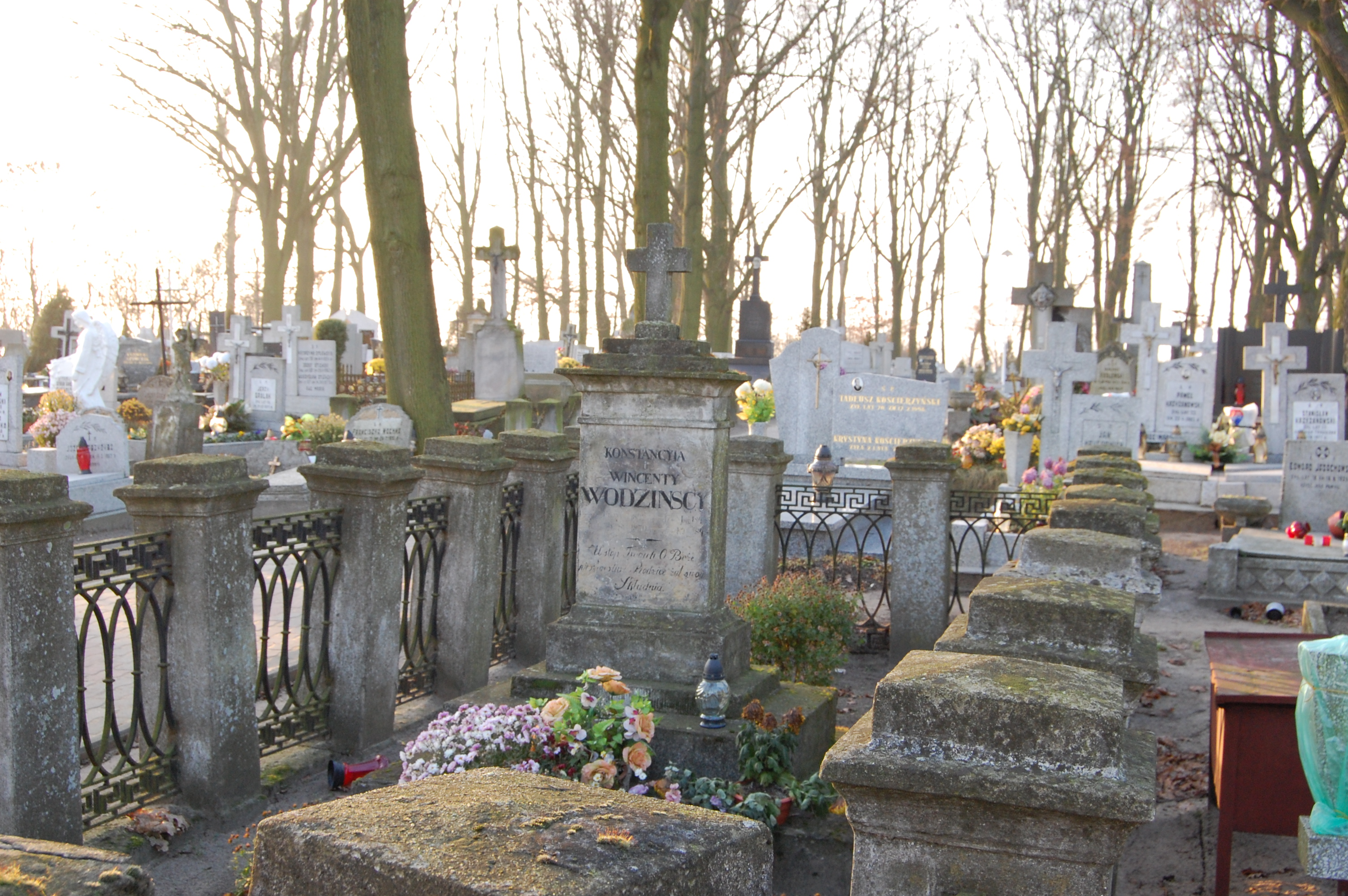
Antoni Wodziński grave

Wodziński maintained relationships and corresponded with many prominent Polish literary figures, including Maria Konopnicka, Eliza Orzeszkowa, Henryk Sienkiewicz, Kazimierz Przerwa-Tetmajer.

He is buried in the Wodziński family tomb at the cemetery in Służewo.
