= Field of Glory (disambiguation) =

Field of Glory or Fields of Glory may refer to:

== Gaming ==
- Field of Glory, a series of computer games based on a 2008 miniature tabletop game
- Fields of Glory, a 1993 computer game
- Panzer Elite Action: Fields of Glory, a 2006 video game
- Fields of Glory, a 1996 wargame by Richard Berg
- Fields of Glory (Shatter), a strategy in Final Fantasy XIV: Heavensward

== Literature ==
- On the Field of Glory, 1906 Polish novel
- Field of Glory, 1990 French novel by Jean Rouaud
- Fields of Glory, 2014 British novel by Michael Jecks
- Fields of Glory: The Diary of Walter Tull, 2004 British novel by Walter Tull

== Places ==
- "Field of Glory", site of the Battle of San Lorenzo in Argentina, 1803
- Sri Ksetra Kingdom ('Field of Glory'), in Myanmar
