= Krzywda, Lublin Voivodeship =

Krzywda
- Village
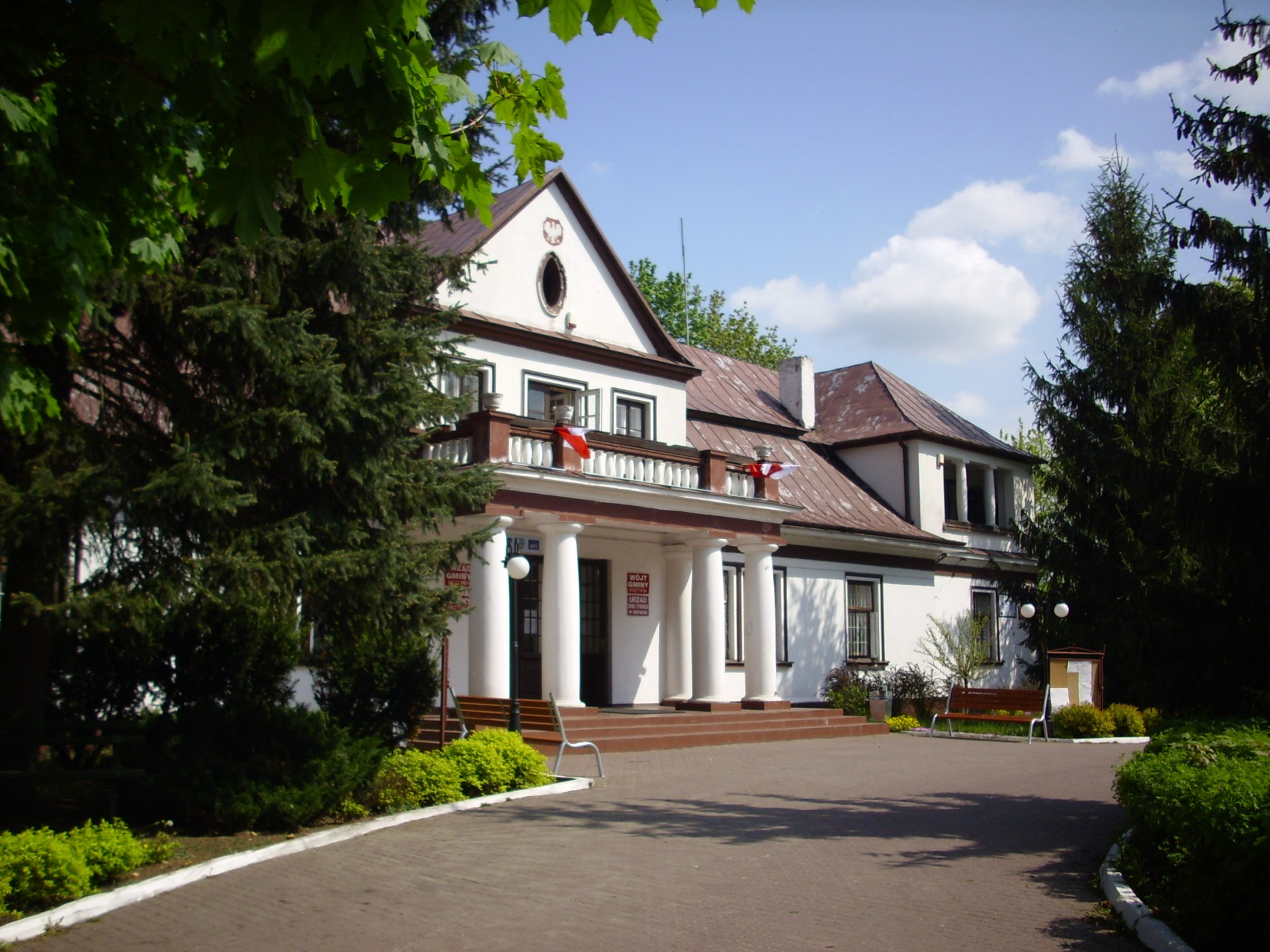
- Manor in Krzywda

- Location within Poland
- Coordinates: 51°47′40″N 22°12′4″E
- Country: Poland
- Voivodeship: Lublin
- County: Łuków
- Gmina: Krzywda
- Population: 1,400

Krzywda [ˈkʂɨvda] is a village in Łuków County, Lublin Voivodeship, in eastern Poland. It is the seat of the gmina (administrative district) called Gmina Krzywda.
