= Budki, Łuków County =

Budki
- Village
- Location within Poland
- Coordinates: 51°47′14″N 22°06′26″E
- Country: Poland
- Voivodeship: Lublin
- County: Łuków
- Gmina: Krzywda

Budki [ˈbutki] is a village in the administrative district of Gmina Krzywda, within Łuków County, Lublin Voivodeship, in eastern Poland.
