= Janko Muzykant =

Short story by Henryk Sienkiewicz

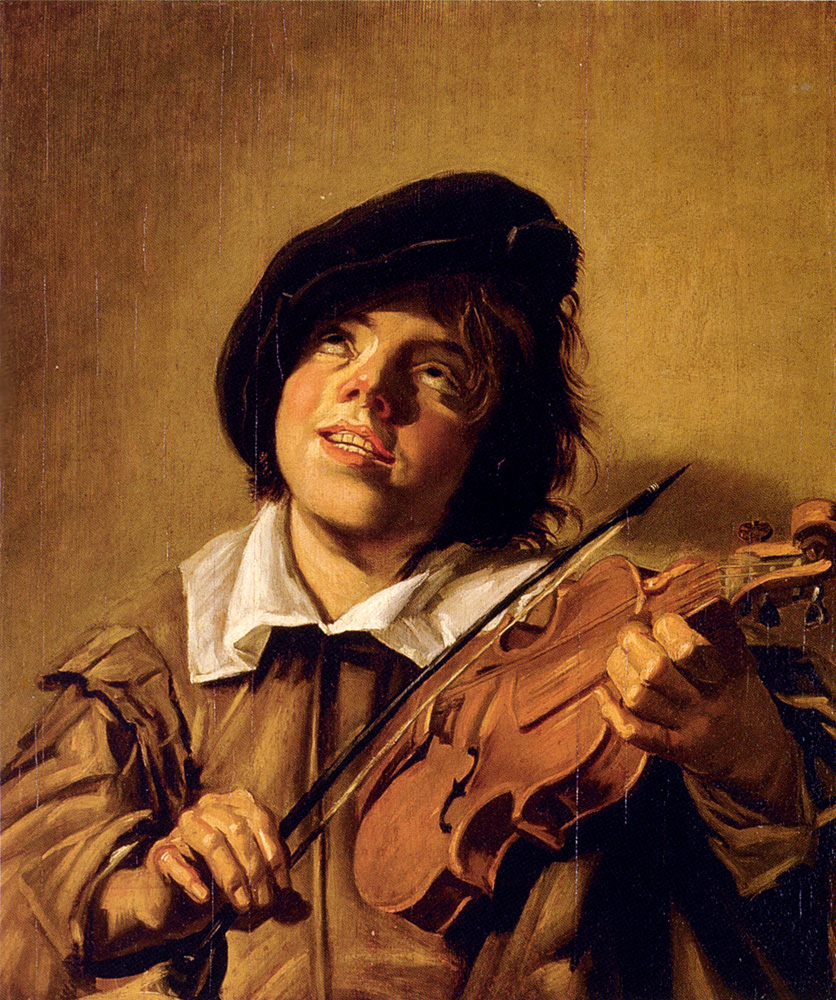
Boy Playing A Violin, 17th-century painting by unknown student of Frans Hals.

Janko Muzykant (translated into English as Janko the Musician, and less commonly as Yanko the Musician or Johnny the Musician) is a short story (also described as novella) by Polish writer and winner of 1905 Nobel Prize in Literature, Henryk Sienkiewicz. It has been described as one of his most successful works in that genre.

Janko Muzykant was first published in the Kurier Warszawski in 1879.

The story is representative of the positivism in Poland period in Polish literature, focusing on social injustice and the wasted life chances for peasant children. Other themes include the folk beliefs and superstitions of uneducated peasantry. The story focuses on the unfair treatment of a child, Janko. Janko is a peasant child with a talent for music who becomes fascinated by the fiddle he hears from a nearby noble manor. He sneaks to the manor to touch them, is captured, sentenced to flagellation, and dies from injuries suffered.

The story was well received in Poland, and was translated into a number of other languages, including English, Spanish and Russian. It was one of Sienkiewicz works cited by Carl David af Wirsén during his speech presenting Sienkiewicz with the 1905 Nobel Prize in Literature. Others have praised it for transcending national prose, and being universal. As early as 1957 the story had been translated by four different English translators, with seven different editions, the earliest of which was published in 1884. In Poland, it has been often included in the list of required school readings.

In 1930 the story was made into a movie under the same name, directed by Ryszard Ordyński. In 1992 it was adapted as a one-hour television special.
