= Laski, Łuków County =

Laski
- Village
- Location within Poland
- Coordinates: 51°49′N 22°5′E
- Country: Poland
- Voivodeship: Lublin
- County: Łuków
- Gmina: Krzywda

Laski (Polish pronunciation: [ˈlaskʲi]) is a village in the administrative district of Gmina Krzywda, within Łuków County, Lublin Voivodeship, in eastern Poland.
