= Huta Dąbrowa =

- Village
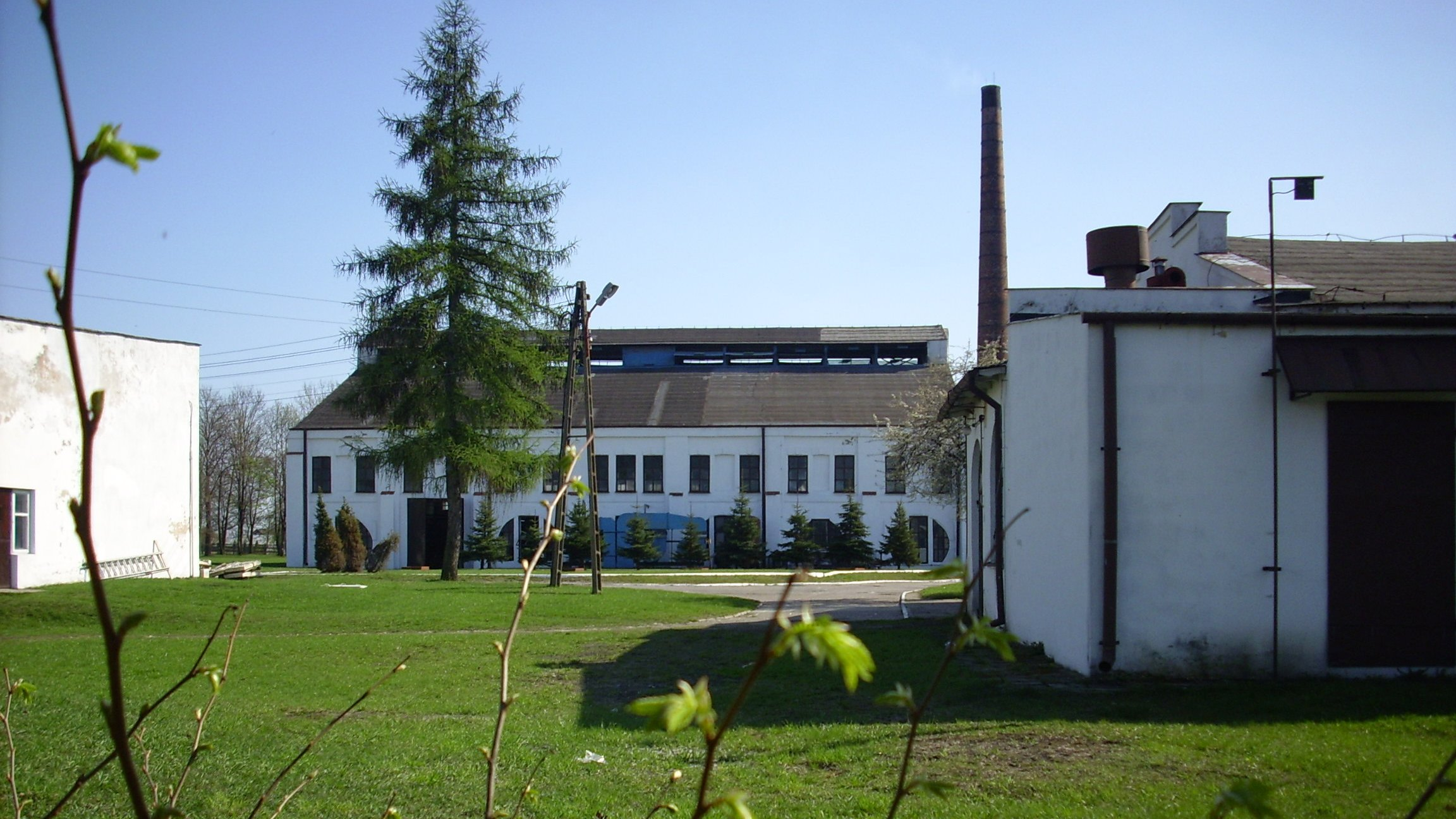

- Location within Poland
- Coordinates: 51°48′26″N 22°2′55″E
- Country: Poland
- Voivodeship: Lublin
- County: Łuków
- Gmina: Krzywda

Population
  - Total: 1,600
- Time zone: UTC+1 (CET)
  - Summer (DST): UTC+2 (CEST)

Huta Dąbrowa [ˈxuta dɔmˈbrɔva] is a village in the administrative district of Gmina Krzywda, within Łuków County, Lublin Voivodeship, in eastern Poland.

== History ==
Seven Polish citizens were murdered by Nazi Germany in the village during World War II.
