= Radoryż Kościelny =

- Village
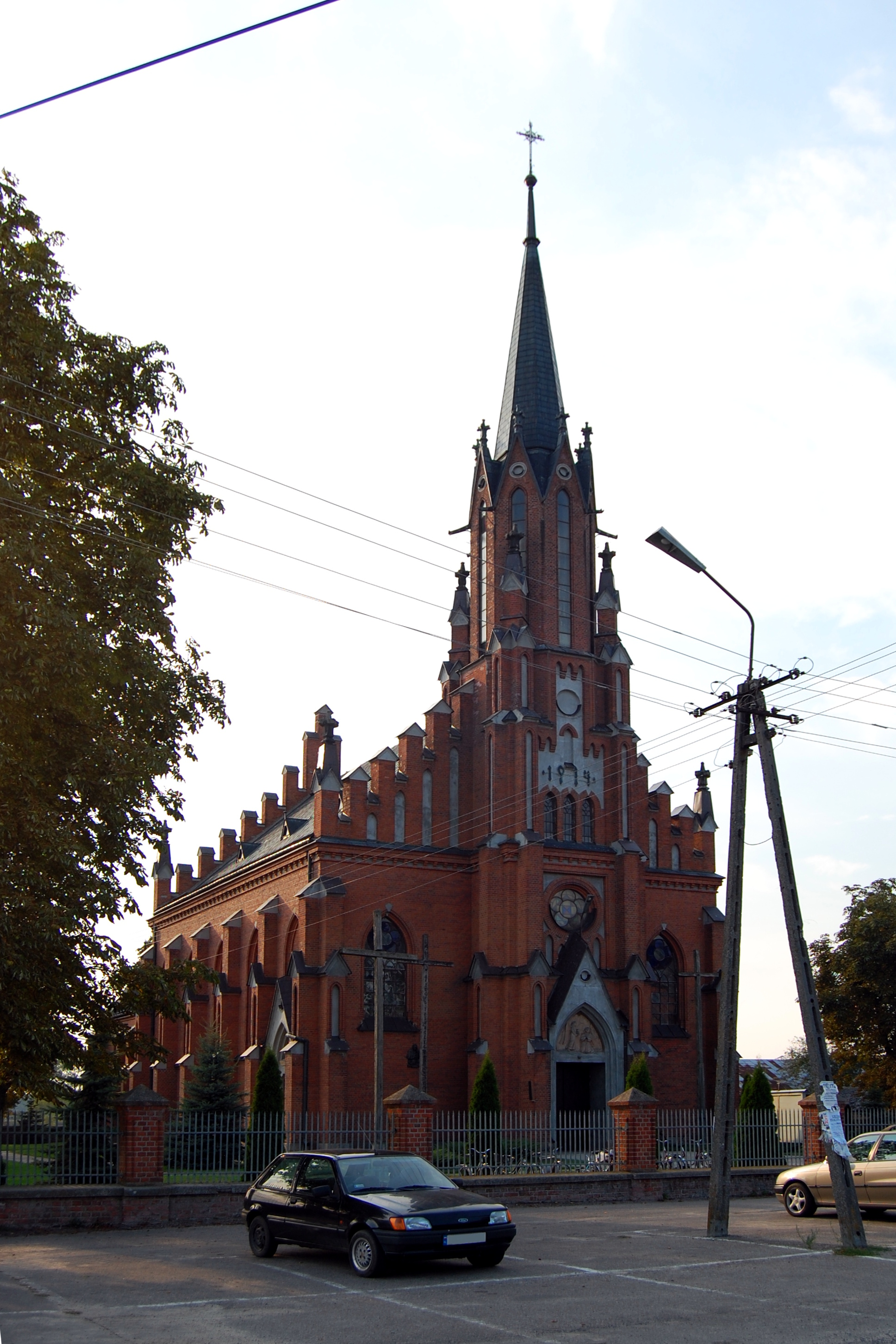
- Church of Our Lady of Częstochowa

- Location within Poland
- Coordinates: 51°48′N 22°9′E
- Country: Poland
- Voivodeship: Lublin
- County: Łuków
- Gmina: Krzywda

Radoryż Kościelny [raˈdɔrɨʂ kɔɕˈt͡ɕɛlnɨ] is a village in the administrative district of Gmina Krzywda, within Łuków County, Lublin Voivodeship, in eastern Poland.
