= Feliksin, Lublin Voivodeship =

Feliksin
- Village
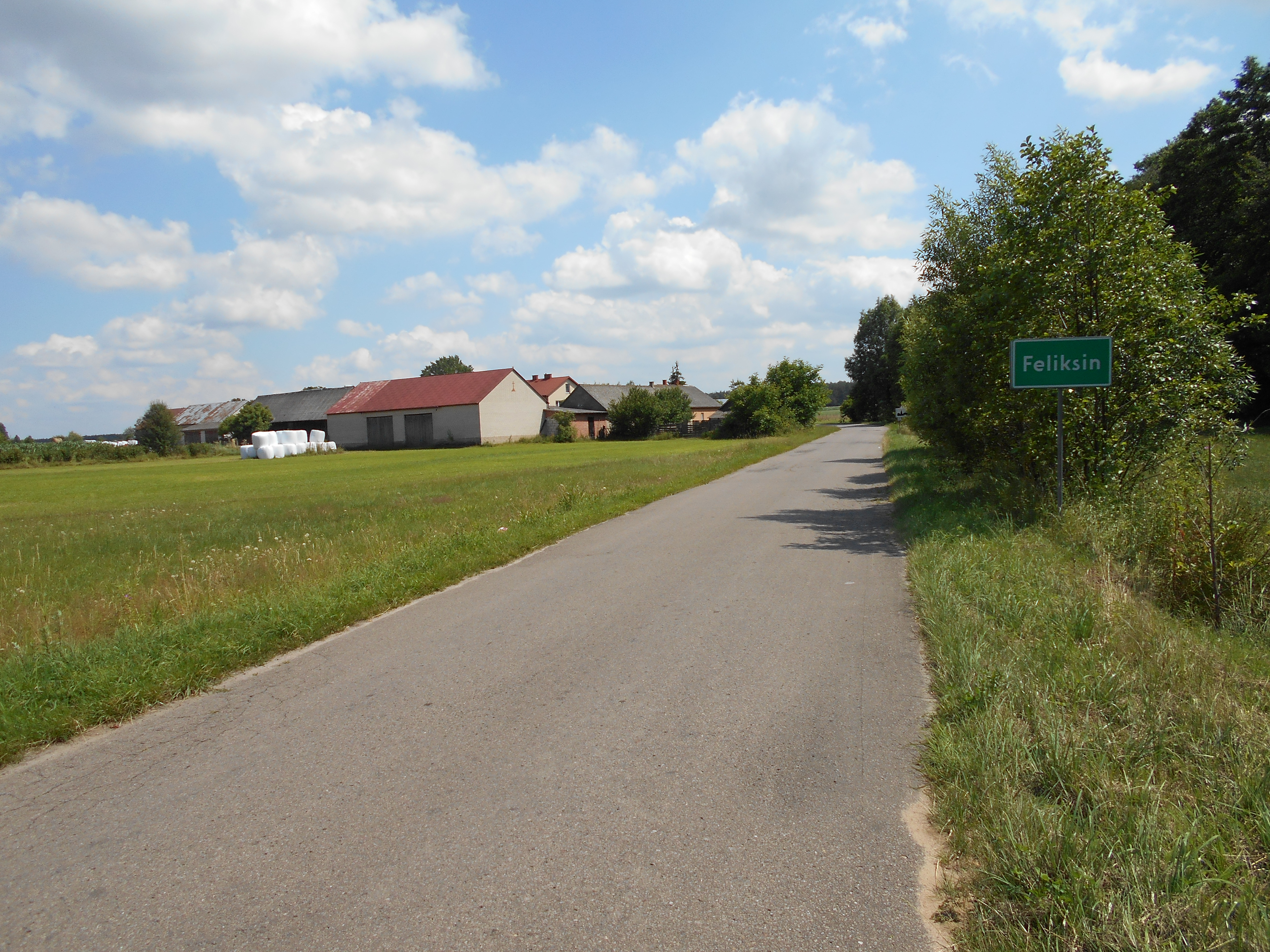

- Location within Poland
- Coordinates: 51°48′N 22°2′E
- Country: Poland
- Voivodeship: Lublin
- County: Łuków
- Gmina: Krzywda
- Time zone: UTC+1 (CET)
  - Summer (DST): UTC+2 (CEST)

Feliksin [fɛˈlikɕin] is a village in the administrative district of Gmina Krzywda, within Łuków County, Lublin Voivodeship, in eastern Poland.

== History ==
Ten Polish citizens were murdered by Nazi Germany in the village during World War II.
