= Huta Radoryska =

- Village
- Location within Poland
- Coordinates: 51°47′N 22°9′E
- Country: Poland
- Voivodeship: Lublin
- County: Łuków
- Gmina: Krzywda

Huta Radoryska [ˈxuta radɔˈrɨska] is a village in the administrative district of Gmina Krzywda, within Łuków County, Lublin Voivodeship, in eastern Poland.
