= Teodorów, Lublin Voivodeship =

Teodorów
- Village
- Location within Poland
- Coordinates: 51°49′31″N 22°3′42″E
- Country: Poland
- Voivodeship: Lublin
- County: Łuków
- Gmina: Krzywda
- Population: 200

Teodorów [tɛɔˈdɔruf] is a village in the administrative district of Gmina Krzywda, within Łuków County, Lublin Voivodeship, in eastern Poland.
