= Gmina Krzywda =

Gmina Krzywda Krzywda Commune
- Gmina
- Flag Coat of arms
- Interactive map of Gmina Krzywda
- Coordinates (Krzywda): 51°48′N 22°12′E
- Country: Poland
- Voivodeship: Lublin
- County: Łuków
- Seat: Krzywda

Area
  - Total: 161.05 km^{2} (62.18 sq mi)

Population (2006)
  - Total: 10,400
  - Density: 64.6/km^{2} (167/sq mi)
- Time zone: UTC+1 (CET)
  - Summer (DST): UTC+2 (CEST)
- Vehicle registration: LLU
- Website: http://www.gminakrzywda.com/

Gmina Krzywda is a rural gmina (administrative district) in Łuków County, Lublin Voivodeship, in eastern Poland. Its seat is the village of Krzywda, which lies approximately 31 kilometres (19 mi) south-west of Łuków and 88 km (55 mi) north-west of the regional capital Lublin.

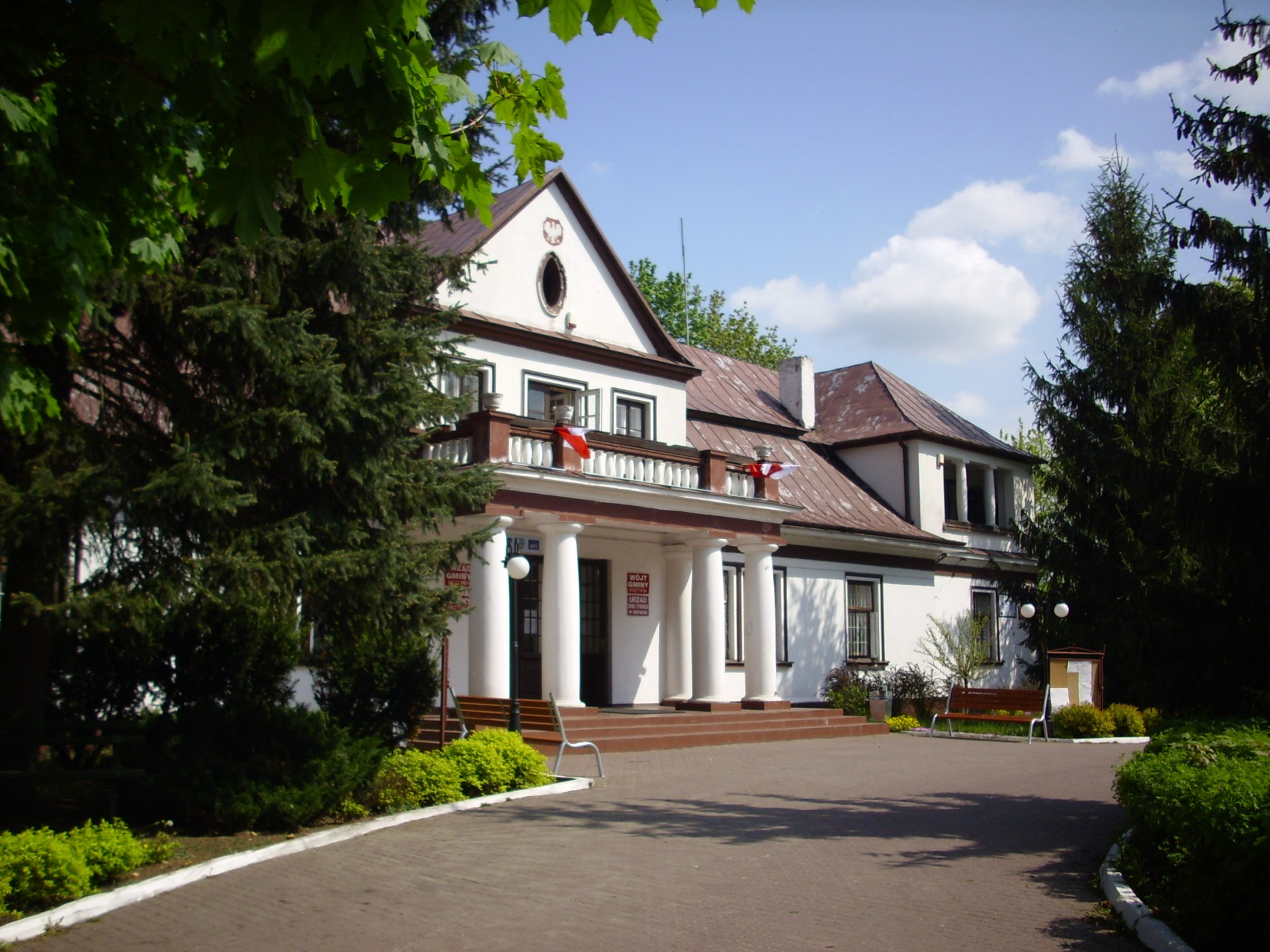

The gmina covers an area of 161.05 square kilometres (62.2 sq mi), and as of 2006 its total population is 10,400.

== Villages ==
Gmina Krzywda contains the villages and settlements of Budki, Cisownik, Drożdżak, Feliksin, Fiukówka, Gołe Łazy, Huta Radoryska, Huta-Dąbrowa, Kasyldów, Kożuchówka, Krzywda, Laski, Nowy Patok, Okrzeja, Podosie, Radoryż Kościelny, Radoryż Smolany, Ruda, Stary Patok, Szczałb, Teodorów, Wielgolas, Wola Okrzejska and Zimna Woda.

== Neighbouring gminas ==
Gmina Krzywda is bordered by the gminas of Adamów, Kłoczew, Nowodwór, Stanin, Wojcieszków and Wola Mysłowska.
