= Ruda, Gmina Krzywda =

Ruda
- Village
- Location within Poland
- Coordinates: 51°48′57″N 22°13′48″E
- Country: Poland
- Voivodeship: Lublin
- County: Łuków
- Gmina: Krzywda

Ruda [ˈruda] is a village in the administrative district of Gmina Krzywda, within Łuków County, Lublin Voivodeship, in eastern Poland.
