= Oszyk coat of arms =

Polish coat of arms

Oszyk
- Alternative names: Orszyk, Orszyki
- Earliest mention: 1775
- Towns: none
- Families: 1 name: Sienkiewicz

Oszyk is a Polish coat of arms. It was used by the Sienkiewicz family.

== Blazon ==
The Coat of arms of Oszyk is a Coat of arms of Łabędź variation.

== Notable bearers ==
Notable bearers of this coat of arms include:

- Henryk Sienkiewicz
- Józef Sienkiewicz

== Gallery ==
Okszyk (odm)

The Coat of arms of Oszyk is considered a variation of the Coat of arms of Łabędź

== See also ==
- Polish heraldry
- Heraldic family
- List of Polish nobility coats of arms

== Bibliography ==
- Juliusz Karol Ostrowski: Księga herbowa rodów polskich. T. 2. Warszawa: Główny skład księgarnia antykwarska B. Bolcewicza, 1897–1906, s. 249.
- Juliusz Karol Ostrowski: Księga herbowa rodów polskich. T. 1. Warszawa: Główny skład księgarnia antykwarska B. Bolcewicza, 1897–1906, s. 241.
