= Drożdżak =

- Village
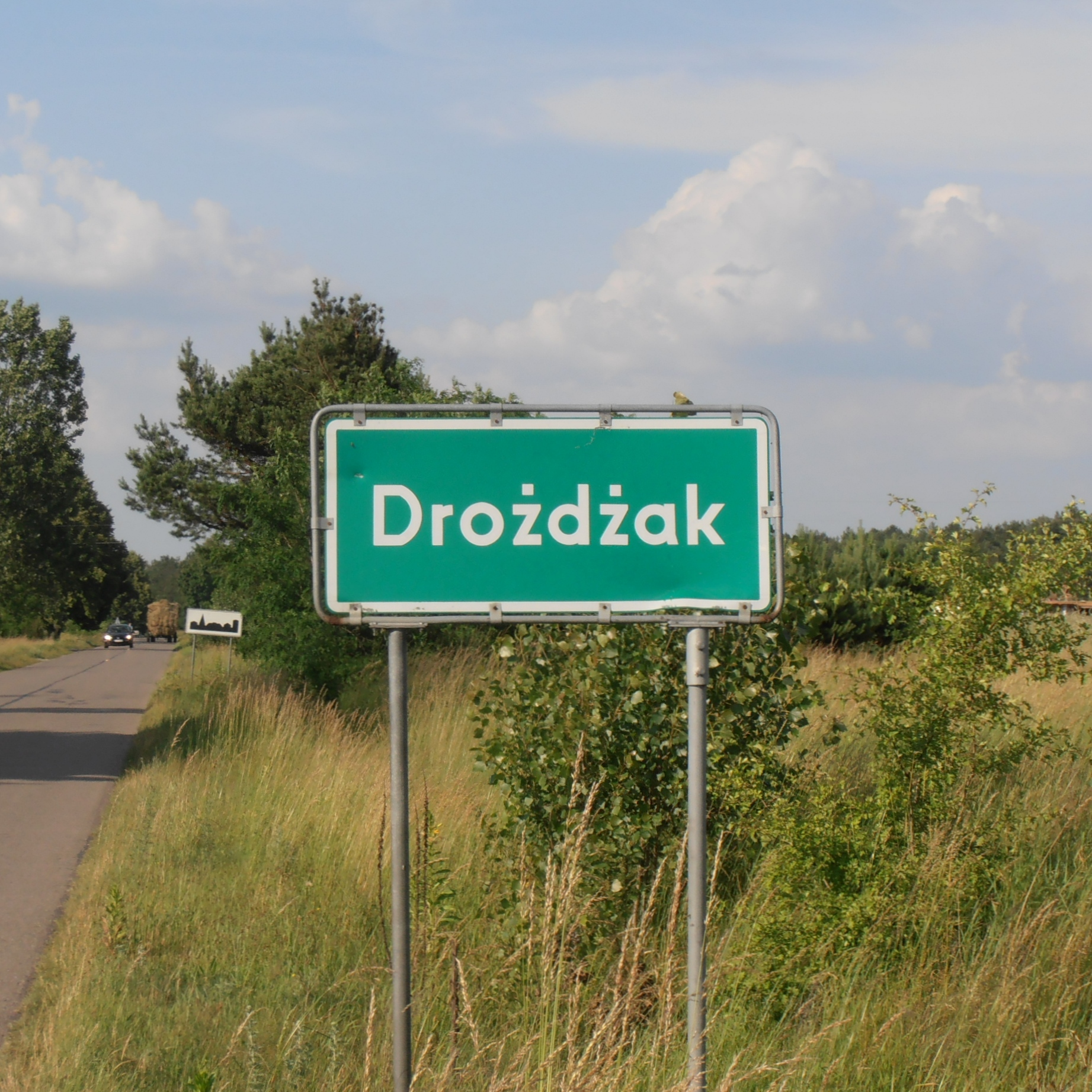
- Road sign leading to Drożdżak

- Location within Poland
- Coordinates: 51°47′23″N 22°10′18″E
- Country: Poland
- Voivodeship: Lublin
- County: Łuków
- Gmina: Krzywda

Drożdżak [ˈdrɔʐd͡ʐak] is a village in the administrative district of Gmina Krzywda, within Łuków County, Lublin Voivodeship, in eastern Poland.
