= Radoryż Smolany =

- Village
- Location within Poland
- Coordinates: 51°48′12″N 22°7′47″E
- Country: Poland
- Voivodeship: Lublin
- County: Łuków
- Gmina: Krzywda
- Population: 480

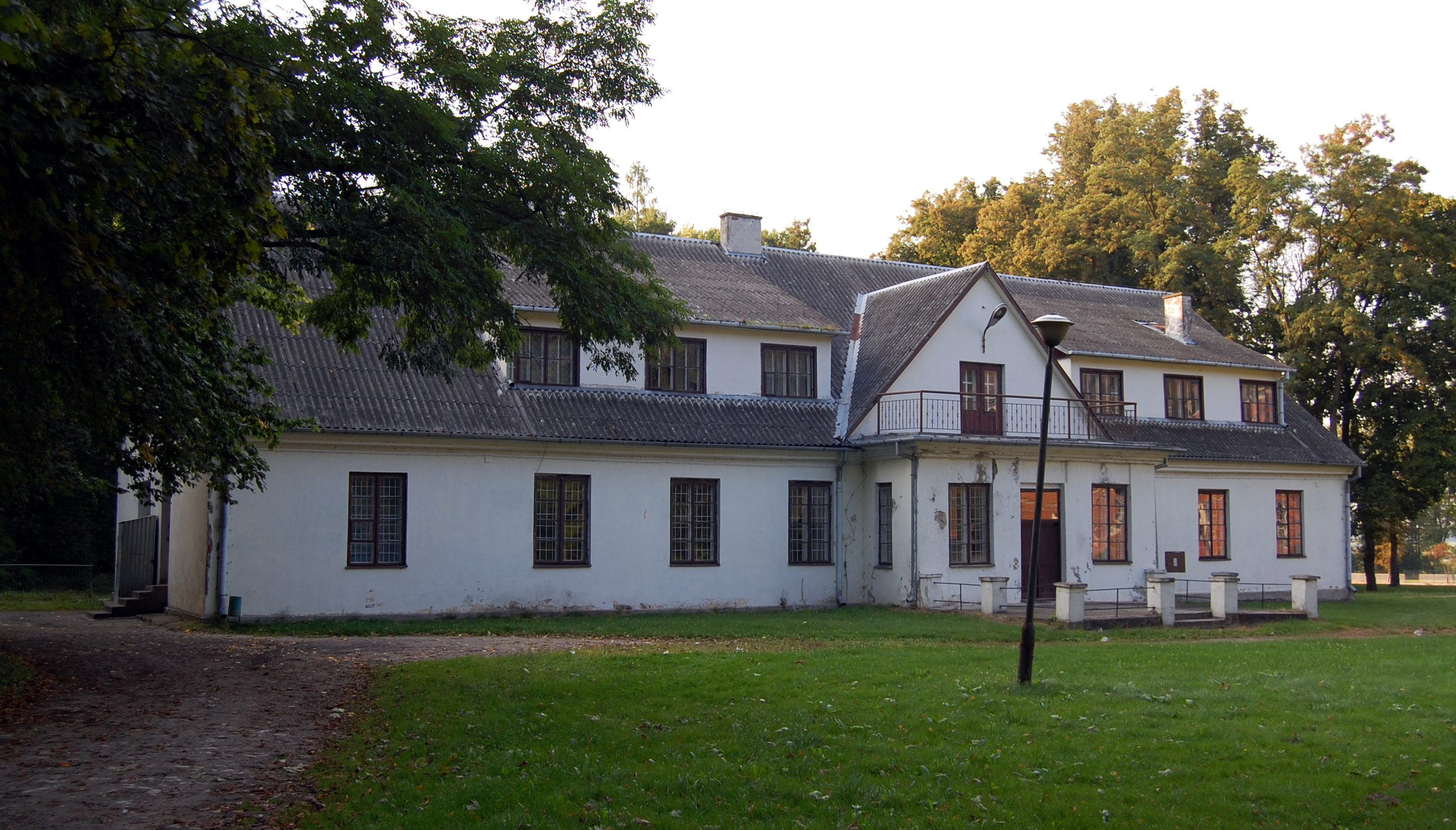
Radoryż Smolany manor house

Radoryż Smolany [raˈdɔrɨʂ smɔˈlanɨ] is a village in the administrative district of Gmina Krzywda, within Łuków County, Lublin Voivodeship, in eastern Poland.
