= Fiukówka =

- Village
- Location within Poland
- Coordinates: 51°51′N 22°7′E
- Country: Poland
- Voivodeship: Lublin
- County: Łuków
- Gmina: Krzywda
- Population (approx.): 500

Fiukówka [fjuˈkufka] is a village in the administrative district of Gmina Krzywda, within Łuków County, Lublin Voivodeship, in eastern Poland.
