= Zimna Woda, Lublin Voivodeship =

Zimna Woda
- Village
- Location within Poland
- Coordinates: 51°48′N 22°15′E
- Country: Poland
- Voivodeship: Lublin
- County: Łuków
- Gmina: Krzywda

Zimna Woda [ˈʑimna ˈvɔda] is a village in the administrative district of Gmina Krzywda, within Łuków County, Lublin Voivodeship, in eastern Poland.
