= Nowy Patok =

- Village
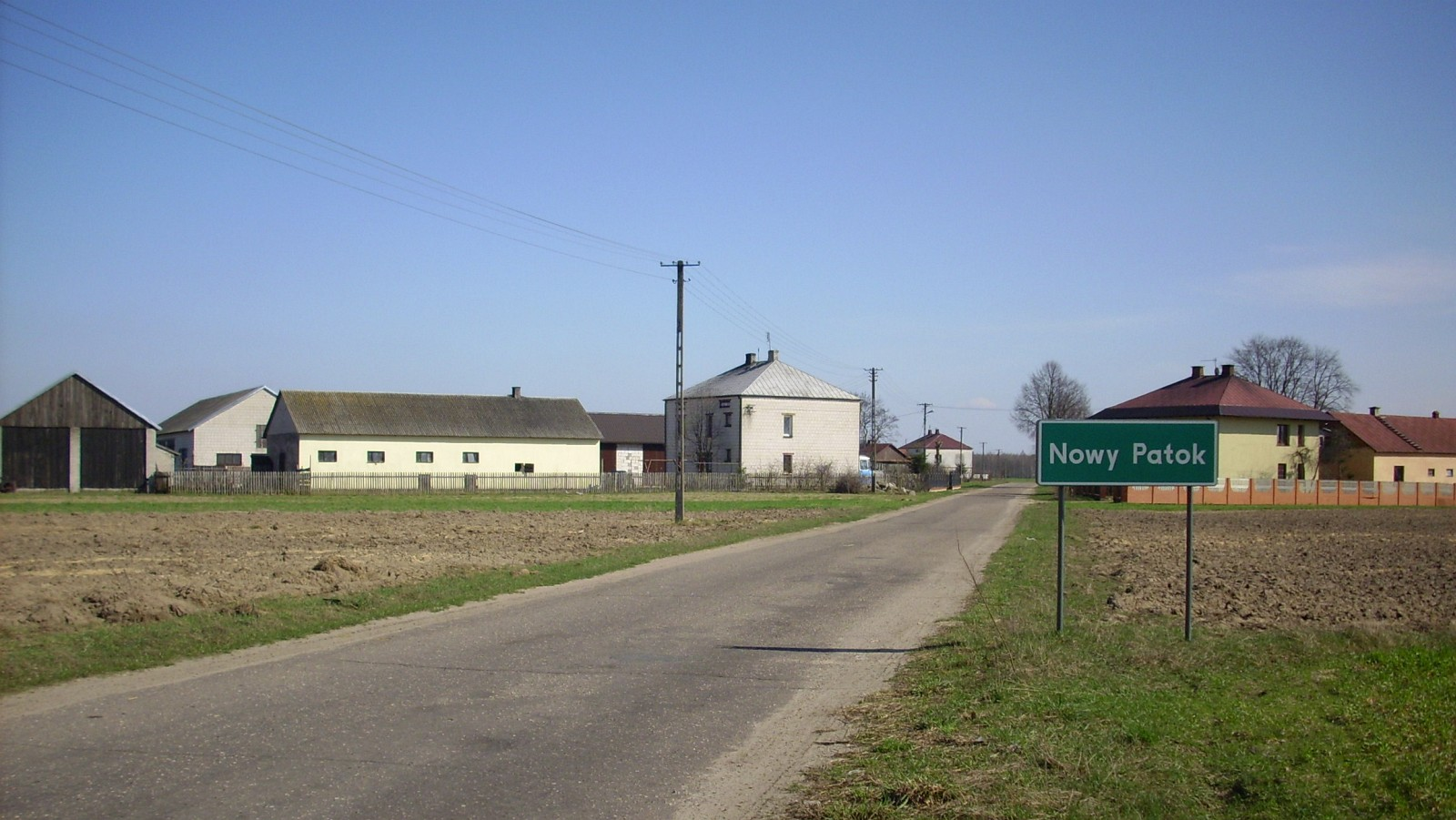

- Location within Poland
- Coordinates: 51°50′13″N 22°09′04″E
- Country: Poland
- Voivodeship: Lublin
- County: Łuków
- Gmina: Krzywda

Nowy Patok [ˈnɔvɨ ˈpatɔk] is a village in the administrative district of Gmina Krzywda, within Łuków County, Lublin Voivodeship, in eastern Poland. It is around 80 km (50 mi) south east of Warsaw.
