= Cisownik, Lublin Voivodeship =

Cisownik
- Village
- Location within Poland
- Coordinates: 51°48′N 22°6′E
- Country: Poland
- Voivodeship: Lublin
- County: Łuków
- Gmina: Krzywda

Cisownik [t͡ɕiˈsɔvnik] is a village in the administrative district of Gmina Krzywda, within Łuków County, Lublin Voivodeship, in eastern Poland.
