= Wola Okrzejska =

- Village
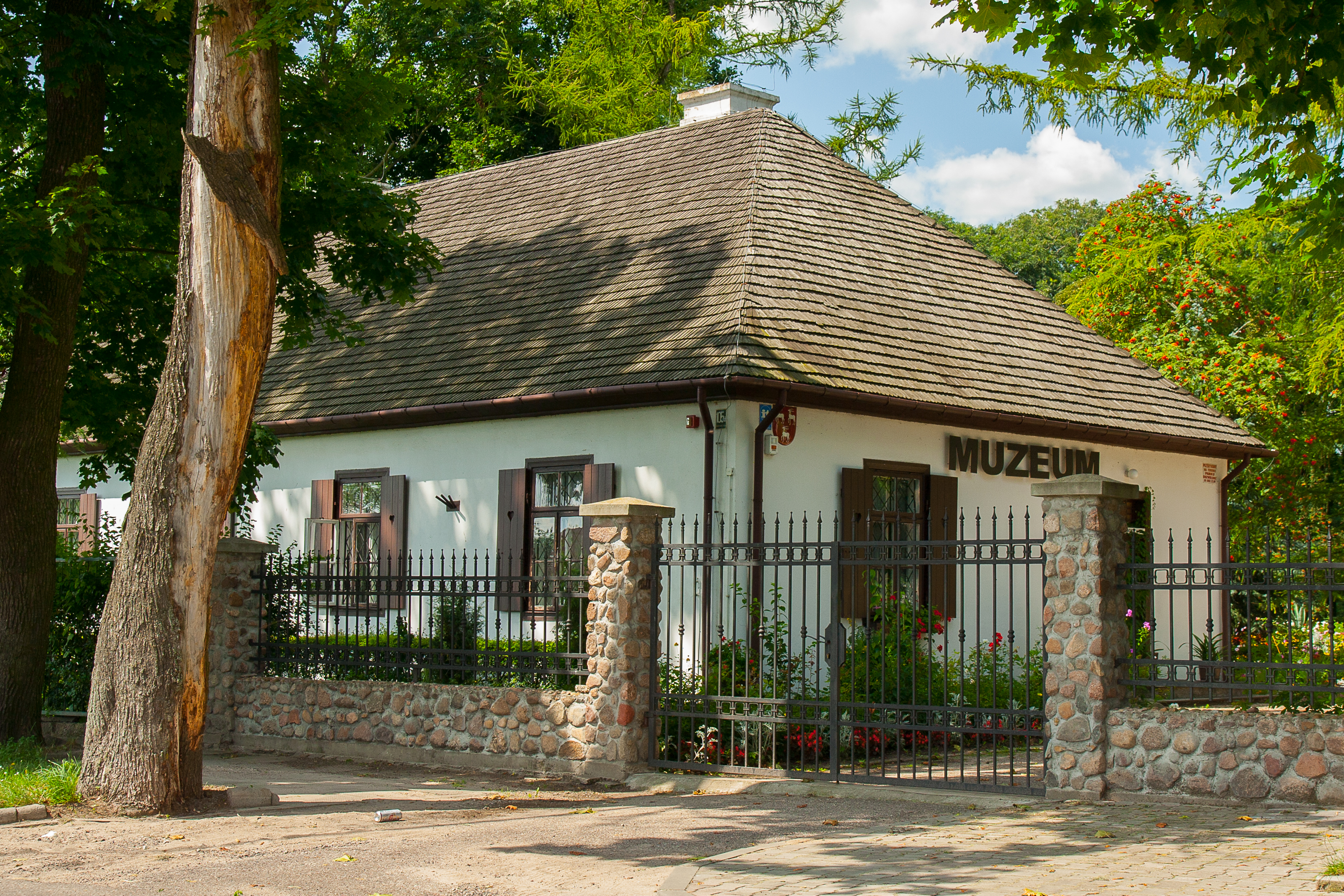
- Henryk Sienkiewicz Museum in Wola Okrzejska

- Location within Poland
- Coordinates: 51°45′N 22°8′E
- Country: Poland
- Voivodeship: Lublin
- County: Łuków
- Gmina: Krzywda

Population
  - Total: 980
- Time zone: UTC+1 (CET)
  - Summer (DST): UTC+2 (CEST)
- Vehicle registration: LLU

Wola Okrzejska [ˈvɔla ɔˈkʂɛi̯ska] is a village in the administrative district of Gmina Krzywda, within Łuków County, Lublin Voivodeship, in eastern Poland.

== History ==
43 Polish citizens were murdered by Nazi Germany in the village during World War II.

== Henryk Sienkiewicz Museum ==
The Museum of Henryk Sienkiewicz is located in Wola Okrzejska at 21-480 Okrzeja; Phone: 025 755 9000; Tel. / fax: 025 797 6000.

== Notable residents ==
- Henryk Sienkiewicz (1846–1916), a Polish journalist and Nobel Prize-winning novelist, was born here
- Lewis Bernstein Namier (1888–1960), an English historian, was born here
