= Podosie, Lublin Voivodeship =

Podosie
- Village
- Location within Poland
- Coordinates: 51°49′N 22°2′E
- Country: Poland
- Voivodeship: Lublin
- County: Łuków
- Gmina: Krzywda

Podosie [pɔˈdɔɕɛ] is a village in the administrative district of Gmina Krzywda, within Łuków County, Lublin Voivodeship, in eastern Poland.

Podosie was the birthplace in 1719 of Gabriel Podoski, prince-archbishop of Poland and Lithuania
