= Stary Patok =

- Village
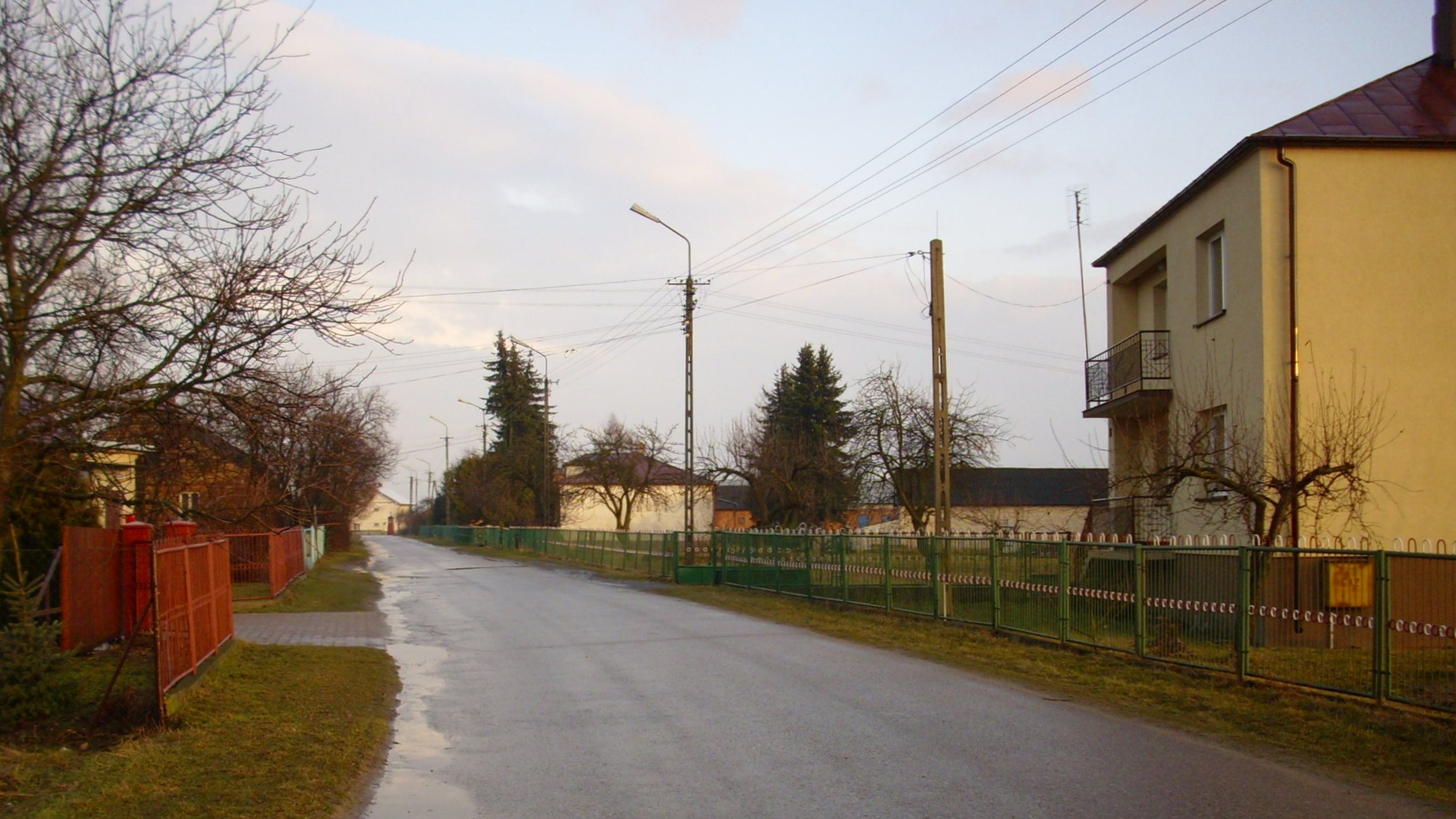

- Location within Poland
- Coordinates: 51°49′46″N 22°08′14″E
- Country: Poland
- Voivodeship: Lublin
- County: Łuków
- Gmina: Krzywda

Stary Patok [ˈstarɨ ˈpatɔk] is a village in the administrative district of Gmina Krzywda, within Łuków County, Lublin Voivodeship, in eastern Poland.
