= Okrzeja =

- Village
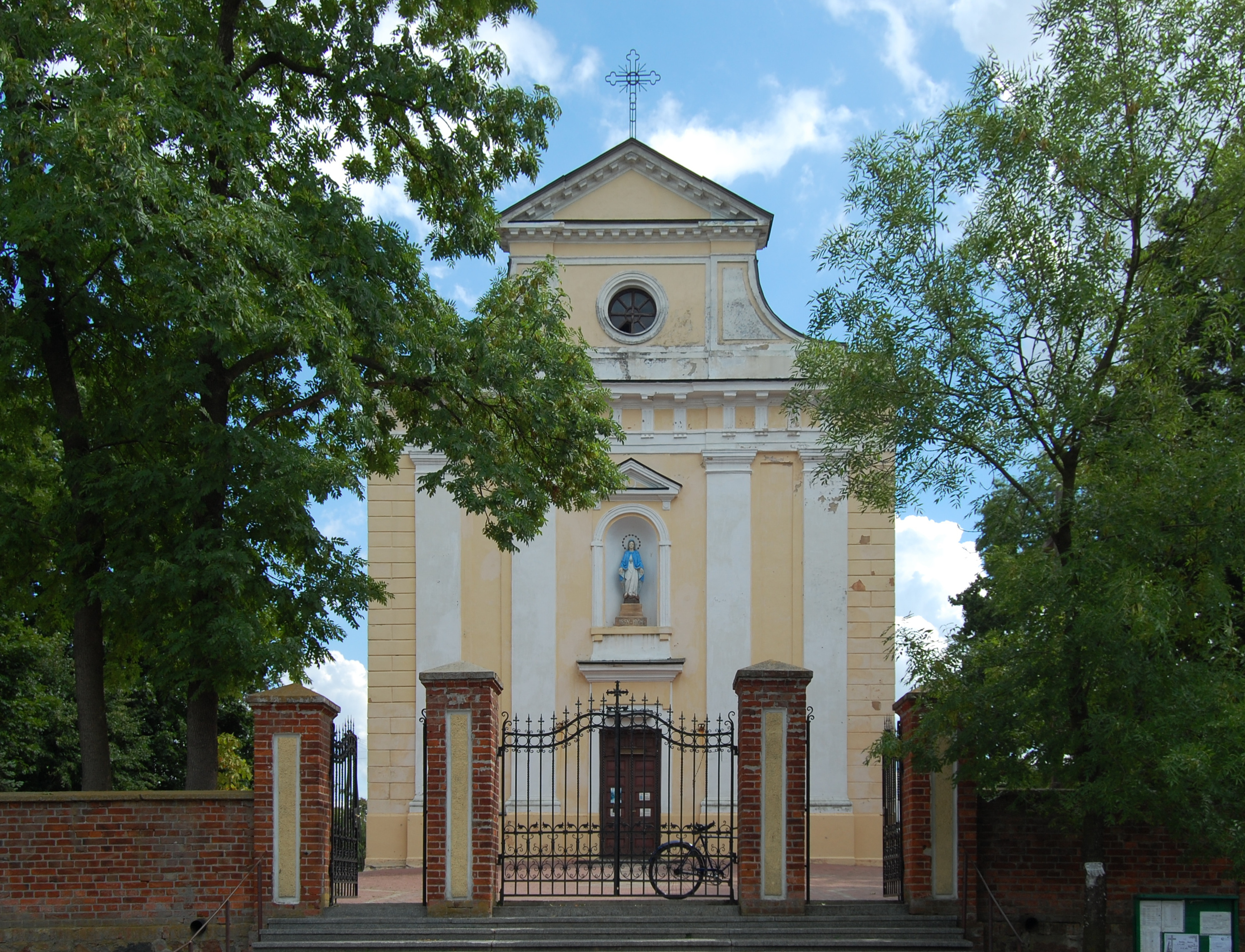
- Church in Okrzeja

- Location within Poland
- Coordinates: 51°45′N 22°8′E
- Country: Poland
- Voivodeship: Lublin
- County: Łuków
- Gmina: Krzywda
- Population: 1,800

Okrzeja [ɔˈkʂɛja] is a village (former town) in the administrative district of Gmina Krzywda, within Łuków County, Lublin Voivodeship, in eastern Poland.
