= On the Field of Glory =

Book by Henryk Sienkiewicz

- First US edition
- Author: Henryk Sienkiewicz
- Original title: Na Polu Chwały
- Translator: Jeremiah Curtin
- Language: Polish
- Genre: Historical novel
- Publisher: Little, Brown (US)
- Publication date: 1906
- Publication place: Poland

On the Field of Glory (Polish: Na Polu Chwały) is a historical novel by the Polish author Henryk Sienkiewicz, published in 1906. The novel tells a story of a fictional young impoverished Polish nobleman and his love for a young aristocratic woman. The story is set during the reign of King John III Sobieski up to the eve of the Battle of Vienna. It was published in the United Kingdom by John Lane, the Bodley Head, London, under the title The Field of Glory, 1906. The Polish original was published: nakład i druk Tow. Akc. S. Orgelbranda Synów, Warszawa, 1906.

== The Plot ==
Chapters 1 - 4

Pan Gideon and his ward, Panna Anulka, are travelling by coach and are rescued from a wolf attack in the forest by Stanislav Tsyprianovitch and his companions – the Bukoyemski brothers. They are invited back by the latter to Yedlinka – a forest farm – and are welcomed by Pan Serafin, Stanislaw’s father and a wealthy retired merchant. They discuss the coming war with the Ottoman Turks.

Pan Yatsek Tachevski, a young impoverished noble, is discovered to have been in a pine tree all night thinking about Anulka, his childhood sweetheart. On their way to Belchantska, the Bukoyemski brothers provoke Tachevski and the party spends the night at Pan Grothus’s house. Over mead the latter suggests that Pan Gideon marry his ward in order to pass on his estates and avoid family squabbles. Yatsek has to spend the night with the Bukoyemskis and eventually challenges the 'road-blockers' to a duel for their insulting behaviour.

Yatsek goes to his patron, Father Voynovski, and a great former soldier the next day and says he will probably die. However, Yatsek fights Stanislav and the brothers and wounds them all. Voynovski treats their wounds, assisted nobly by Yatsek, which alters the attitude of his 'enemies'. They return to Pan Gideon’s house and he is furious with Yatsek and treats him dishonourably and is rejected by Anulka. The lovers quarrel and Yatsek vows never to see her again.

Chapters 5 - 8

Yatsek is assisted by Voynovski to go into the world. Anulka feels guilty and sends a servant, Voitushko, to Vyrambki to tell Tachevski she is sorry. Yatsek, however, has gone to Radom to buy equipment for a warrior. Voynovski worries how he will be able to finance his expedition but Pan Serafin loans him money as a mortgage on Vyrambki, Tachevski’s property. Voynovski receives a letter from Pan Gideon which insults Tachevski, and all believe Anulka prompted him to write it.

Chapters 9 –14

Father Voynovski writes a rude reply to Gideon and Anulka reads and is angered by it. However, she weeps tears of remorse over Yatsek but believes he will never return to Belchantska. Pan Gideon learns from the Bukoyemskis that Yatsek and Stanislav have both joined the Hussars. Pan Gideon meets his old friend, the prelate Tvorkovski, in whom he confides that he wishes to marry Anulka and asks him to put his case to her. Back at Gideon’s house the prelate speaks to Anulka and she accepts Gideon’s hand in marriage. Guests come to Belchantska for the engagement including his relatives. Pan Krepetski and his son, Martsian, nicknamed 'Pniak' (stump), a relative whom Gideon previously threw out of his house for making eyes at Anulka. At the engagement feast dark omens are observed and Pan Gideon collapses and dies in his chamber.

Martsian and his father take over the house and the son confides that he plans to marry Anulka for whom he lusts. His sisters gradually start to dominate Anulka and steal her wedding trousseau.

Chapters 15 - 19

Pan Serafin confides his worries over Anulka’s situation to Voynovski who is unsympathetic because of her treatment of Yatsek. The Bokoyemskis appear at Yeklinka one evening and confide they have lost all their horses and wealth through gambling in Warsaw. Lukasz slashed Podarski, their deceiver, in the face near the King’s palace, a capital crime, and was forced to flee. Pan Serafin is angry with them and they all go to Voynovski’s house. Serafin and Voynovski learn from Vilchopolski, Gideon’s former factor and now the manager of Vyrambki, how Anulka defended Gideon’s serfs from the rod.

Martsian is resolved to have Anulka, even by force, and she fears his love even more than the hatred of his old maid sisters. He tells her he wants her as his wife but she spurns him and he beats her. Martsian’s butler tears him away and, after getting him back to his room where he gets drunk and spirits Anulka away to Pan Serafin’s who takes her in.

The Bokoyemskis decide to exact revenge. The older Krepetski comes to Serafin to ask for Anulka back but he refuses. Their conversation is interrupted by shouting – the four Bokoyemskis are chasing Martsian and his horse and they have been tarred and feathered. The father aids his son and they return to Bhlchantska.

Chapters 20 – 25

Pan Serafin resolves that all will travel to Kraków to see Stanislav and Yatsek and Pan Serafin wishes to join the army against the (dog-believer) Turk. Anulka will be left with the prelate in Radom. On the road they fear an ambush from Martsian but believe their party is strong enough to fend off an attack. They reach Radom safely and stay there for the first night of the journey.

The next evening they encounter a roadblock and face an ambuscade. Father Voynovski takes charge but sees they are outnumbered – the Bukoyemskis charge their opponents and are about to be cut down when the latter start to withdraw and Voynovski is heartened to see Yatsek and Stanislav come to the rescue with their regiment. Yatsek sees Anulka but faints from his wounds. From the prisoners they learn that Martsian paid the brigands to make the attack and resolve to bring him to trial in Cracow. Anulka tends Yatsek in a covered wagon and they make up and are cheered by the regiment, 'Vivant! Crescant! Floreant!’

Chapters 25 – 28

Lodgings are found in Kraków and Stanislav resolves that Yatsek and Anulka should have some time together after their marriage before he joins the campaign. The Bokoyemski’s disappear but return and give Voynovski Martsian’s ear who berates them for behaving like savages. The wedding takes place and all are overcome by Anulka’s virginal beauty and modesty. King Sobieski and his wife are present and together leave the city two days later to march to Vienna.

Standing on a hill, the troops march past their king and Pani Tachevski sees her husband for the last time, 'all in iron and winged armour, the ear pieces of his helmet hid his cheeks altogether ... Yatsek turned his iron-covered head toward his wife and moved his lips as if whispering ... he was giving her the last "Fare thee well!”. The prince bishop of Kraków blesses the troops holding the cross and relics above his head and twenty thousand men raise their anthem to God.

== Historical background ==
The book is set on the eve of the second siege of Vienna which was crushed in 1683 by Sobieski and the firmness of his allies. Had the Polish king not appeared, the Sultan would have triumphed, hence Sobieski and his troops were hailed as the saviours of Vienna and Sienkiewicz's novel reflects the enthusiasm of the time for the Polish king, and his queen Marie Casimire Louise de la Grange d'Arquien ('Marysienka', whom he married in 1665), which was tremendous.

According to the translator, Jeremiah Curtin, the Polish character in most of its main traits is represented in this historical novel, developed from Polish experience with Germany, Russia, Rome, Byzantium and with the Turks and Tartars. As he states in his introduction, 'Through this great host of enemies and allies, and their own special character, came that incisive dramatic career which at last met a failure so crushingly manifest', (a probable reference here to the eventual dividing of Poland into the three partitions).

Battle of Vienna

Sobieski was in joint command of Polish, Austrian and German troops, against the invading Turks under Kara Mustafa. Upon reaching Vienna, Sobieski had planned to attack on September 13, but with the Turkish close to breaching the walls he ordered a full attack on September 12. At 4 a.m. the united army of about 81,000 men attacked a Turkish force of about 130,000 men. At about five o'clock in the afternoon, after observing the infantry battle from the hilltop, Sobieski led Polish husaria cavalry along with Austrians and Germans into a massive charge down the hillside. Soon, the Turkish battle line was broken and the Ottoman forces scattered in confusion. At 5:30 p.m. Sobieski entered the deserted tent of Kara Mustafa and the battle of Vienna ended.

== Sources ==
On the Field of Glory, Henryk Sienkiewicz, authorised and unabridged translation from the Polish original by Jeremiah Curtin, Little, Brown and Company, Boston (copyright 1906).
