= Without Dogma =

Novel by Henryk Sienkiewicz

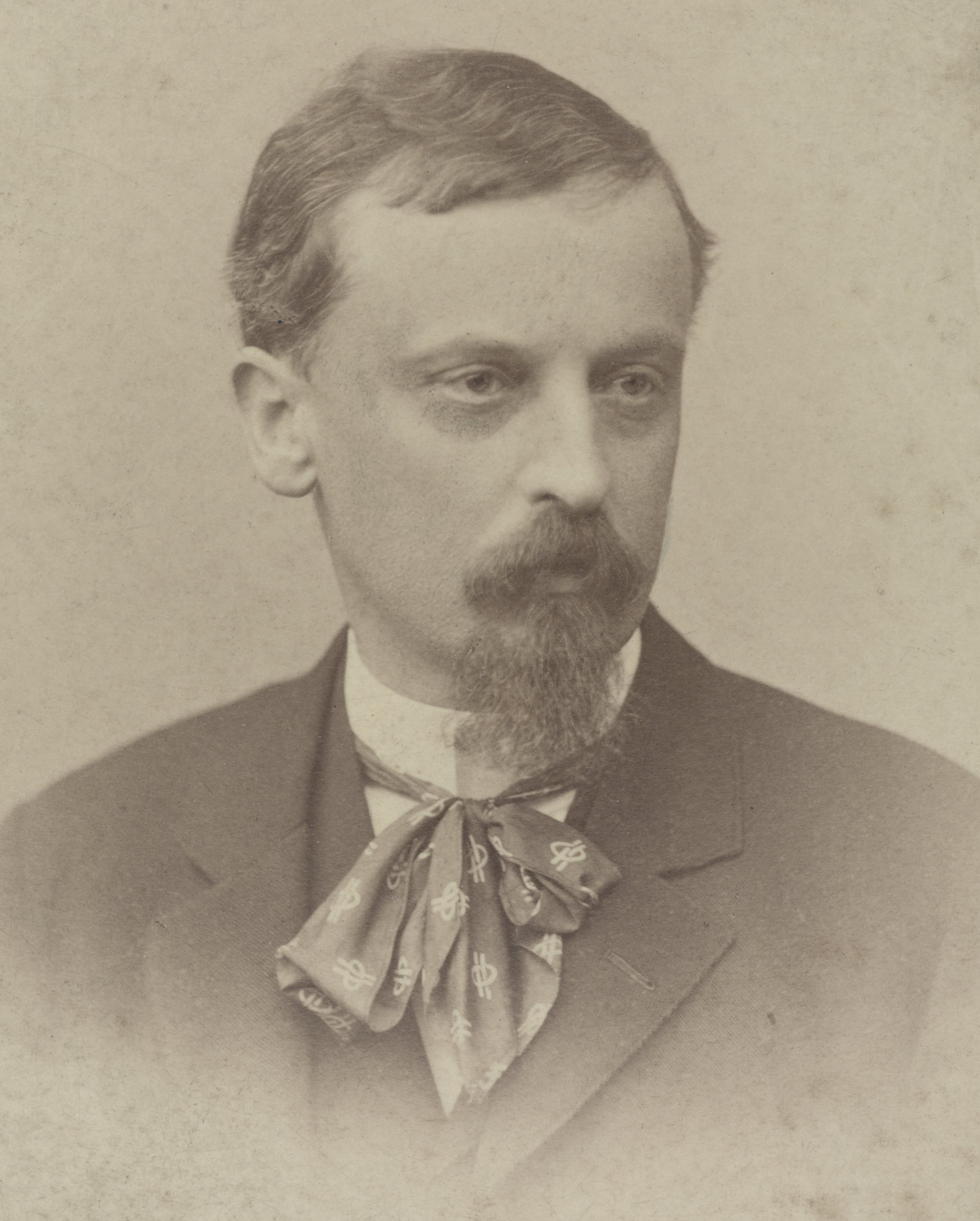
- Author: Henryk Sienkiewicz
- Original title: Bez dogmatu
- Language: Polish
- Genre: Novel of manners
- Publication date: 1891
- Publication place: Poland

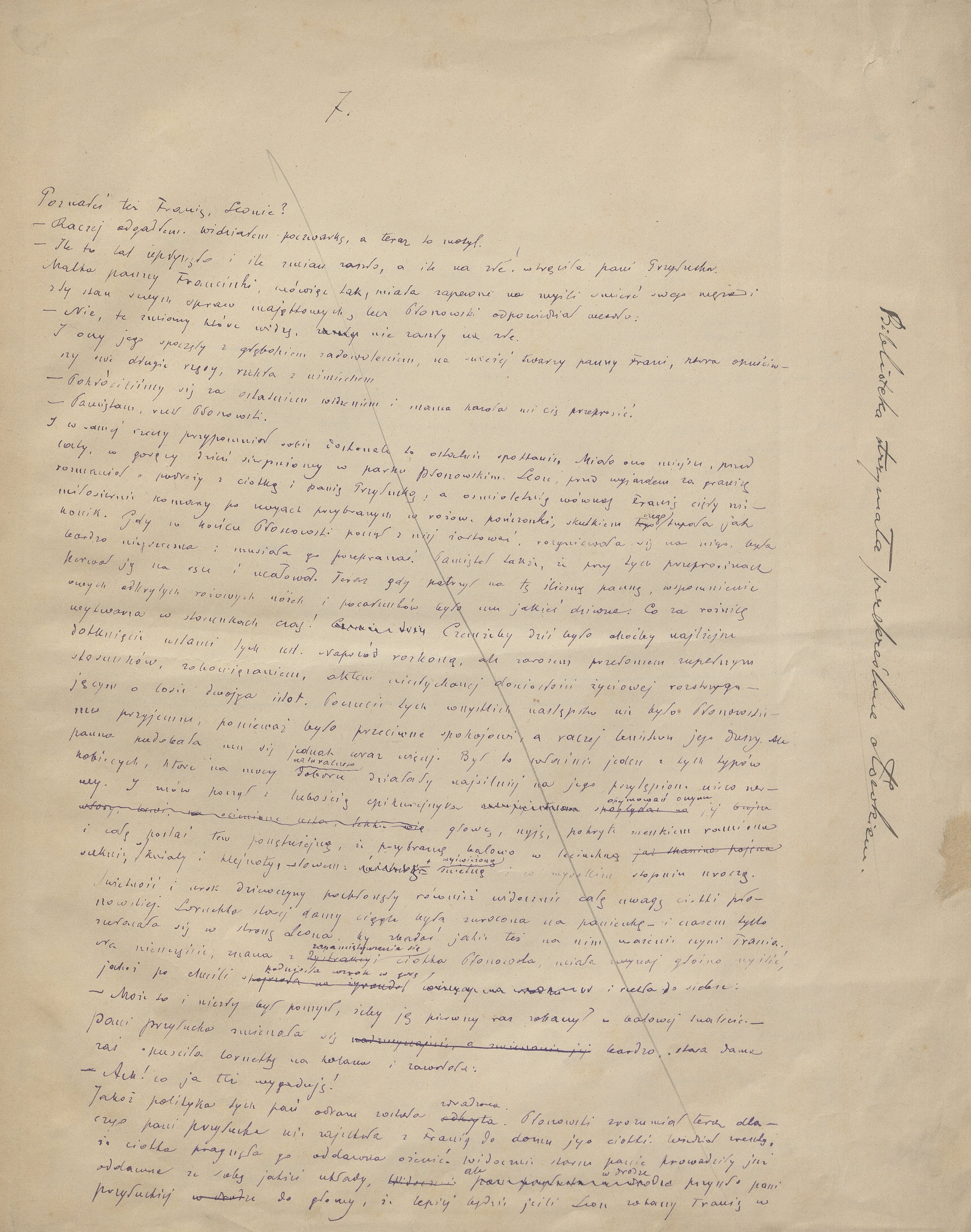
The manuscript of the novel

Without dogma is a novel of manners by Henryk Sienkiewicz, a Polish Nobel Prize in Literature winner, published in 1891. Its narrative concentrates around the experiences of Leon Płoszowski, a man from a wealthy aristocratic family, who struggles to find the meaning of life in world without morality by trying to self-analyze his feelings towards the encountered women. The novel has been associated to decadent movement, attacked for no clear condemnation of immoral acts and received as an attempt to picture the fin de siècle generation. Written in first person, the novel is the only one of Sienkiewicz's works that follows diary format.

== Background ==
After publishing his Trilogy, Sienkiewicz quickly became the most popular living Polish writer. As English publisher of Without Dogma wrote in the preface in 1893 edition:

What Wagner did for Germany in music, what Dumas did for France, and Scott for all English-speaking people, the great Pole has achieved for his own country in literature.

As his works were considered an embodiment of national virtues, Sienkiewicz surprised the public by his choice to portrait a contemporary society from a profligate's perspective.

Deeply influenced by conservative circles, Sienkiewicz was worried about what he believed to be the moral decay of the decadent youth. As patriotic, but muted and focused on every-day reality, values and slogans preached by Sienkiewicz's generation (such as gradual work for the improvement of socio-economic status of peasants) seemed for the young as too earthbound, many claimed that a pursuit for a personal happiness is what interest them more than public affairs. Even founders of the Polish positivism became by that time disappointed by the underwhelming effects of their work and worsening situation of Polish society in general, as can be seen in other novels of that time, including The Doll by Bolesław Prus. Sienkiewicz believed that such selfish attitude leads to unacceptable lapses in ethical behavior and has to be condemned. He intended to demonstrate the true motivations of the decadents in order to lampoon them.

== Plot summary ==
The action starts in early 1889 and lasts almost two years. It takes place in Rome, Płoszów (where the main hero's manor house is), Paris, Warsaw, Berlin, Marçà, Florence and Gastein. Encouraged by his friend who “asserted that anybody who keeps a diary works for the common good, and does a meritorious thing.”, Leon Płoszowski, a thirty-five-year-old man from a wealthy family, begins to describe his everyday experiences and problems. As his aunt tries who serve as a matchmaker, he meets beautiful Anielka and falls in love with her. They become close to each other but just when everyone think that Płoszowski is about to propose to her, he receives news about a serious health condition that his father is in. Leon travels to visit him and meets Laura, an old friend who seems to be the opposite of sweet and innocent Anielka. She ignores her ill husband and a turbulent affair with Leon begins. When troubled Anielka writes Leon, he advises her in a letter to “consider herself free”. In despair, she marries the first man who proposes to her. When Leon returns, he haunts Anielka, now a faithful wife. Unsettled and depressed Anielka falls ill, discovers that she is pregnant and dies. Płoszowski finds himself guilty of what happened and commits suicide with a hope of oblivion.

== Reception ==
"Without dogma" didn't live to many readers expectations, as instead of giving them a mythicized picture of Poland's past they wanted to read about, it focused on contemporary society and offered little action burdened with extended psychological analysis of the main hero's character.

Contrary to the writer's intentions, the novel became very popular among the young who identified themselves with the main character and did not want to condemn his actions. Vibrant descriptions of Płoszowski's experiences and feelings, which could be possible only in a diary format, seemed so engrossing that he evoked sympathy of the young, astray readers. Combined with accurate diagnosis of its causes, the vision of “moral turpitude” created by Sienkiewicz was too tempting to scare off the public, regardless of Płoszowski's emotional misery and the sad end. Even Stanisław Przybyszewski, who later became of Sienkiewicz's most fervent critics, claimed to be “totally flabbergasted” and very thankful to Sienkiewicz for “describing his soul so perfectly”.

== Interpretations ==
Ryszard Koziołek emphasizes the transgressive role of esthetic in Sienkiewicz's works. He argues that the main issue in “Without dogma” is an ability of an esthetic object (defined usually as a piece of art, but on some occasions also as a woman or nature) to smooth away the evanescence of human being. As can be seen in his private letters and notes on literature, Sienkiewicz was an independent artist with a lot of self-esteem who sought to create in his works a substitution of a real world that could be meaningful and purposeful.

Krystyna Kłosińska rated "Without Dogma" among the "novels about the fitful age". In her opinion, Płoszowski fits into a characteristic of a person suffering from neurosis as it was understood in the nineteenth century. She compares him to Jean des Esseintes from À rebours and characters from few other Polish novels published at the end of the nineteenth century.

Sienkiewicz underlined the very universal character of the novel in a letter to Mścisław Godlewski when he wrote: “No one is Płoszowski entirely, but everyone is Płoszowski to some extent.”

Currently, Bez dogmatu serves as a name for a Polish anticlerical quarterly magazine established in 1993.
