= Leszczanka =

Leszczanka may refer to the following places:

- Leszczanka, Gmina Drelów, Biała County in Lublin Voivodeship (east Poland)
- Leszczanka, Chełm County in Lublin Voivodeship (east Poland)
- Leszczanka, Łuków County in Lublin Voivodeship (east Poland)
