= Matylda Getter =

Polish Catholic nun

- Portrait from before the Holocaust
- Born: Matylda Getter; 25 February 1870
- Died: 8 August 1968 (aged 98)
- Known for: Polish Righteous among the Nations

Matylda Getter (25 February 1870 – 8 August 1968) was a Polish Catholic nun, mother provincial of CSFFM (Congregatio Sororum Franciscalium Familiae Mariae, Franciscan Sisters of the Family of Mary) in Warsaw and social worker in pre-war Poland. In German-occupied Warsaw during World War II she cooperated with Irena Sendler and the Żegota resistance organization in saving the lives of hundreds of Jewish children from the Warsaw Ghetto. She was recognized as one of Polish Righteous among the Nations by Yad Vashem for her rescue activities.

== Biography ==
She started social work before World War II and she received a number of the highest national distinctions in honor of her achievements in her educational and social work. She had founded over twenty education and care facilities for children in Anin, Białołęka, Chotomów, Międzylesie, Płudy, Sejny, Wilno and others.

== Activity during World War II ==
From the beginning of the war the Franciscan Sisters of the Family of Mary, “in the spirit of Christian love and Franciscan joy,” brought aid to those in need, both civilians and members of the Polish underground. Sisters arranged work, provided shelter and distributed false documents. During the Warsaw Uprising in the provincial house at Hoża St. 53, the sisters ran a paramedical station and a soup kitchen, later turned into a hospital.

“I’m saving a human being who’s asking for help” – Matylda Getter

Mother Matylda Getter declared that she would take in every Jewish child she could. During the occupation, the Order's Sisters rescued between 250 and 550 Jewish children from the ghetto. Yad Vashem credits Mother Matylda with saving life of at least 40 girls on their website. Mother Matylda risked her life and the lives of her Sisters by taking the children into her orphanages and hiring adults to work with them, caring for the children in facilities scattered around Poland. As the superior of the Warsaw Province of the Franciscan Sisters of the Family of Mary, she took on the responsibility of obtaining birth certificates for the children and hiding them in the order's educational institutions.

== Bibliography ==
- Mordecai Paldiel "Churches and the Holocaust: unholy teaching, good samaritans, and reconciliation" p. 209-210, KTAV Publishing House, Inc., 2006, ISBN 0-88125-908-X, ISBN 978-0-88125-908-7
- „Siostry Zakonne w Polsce. Słownik biograficzny”, t. 1, p. 93.,
- "Kościół katolicki na ziemiach Polski w czasie II wojny światowej", t. XI, Warszawa 1981
- "Siostry Rodziny Maryi z pomocą dzieciom polskim i żydowskim w Międzylesiu i Aninie", Biblioteka Wawerska, Warszawa 2006,
- "Za cenę życia", "Ład", Warszawa, 1983 nr 17 1983,
- "Wspomnienie... o Matce Matyldzie Getter "Matusia", "Słowo Powszechne", 1968, nr 35
