= Gmina Rejowiec Fabryczny =

Gmina Rejowiec Fabryczny Rejowiec Fabryczny Commune
- Gmina
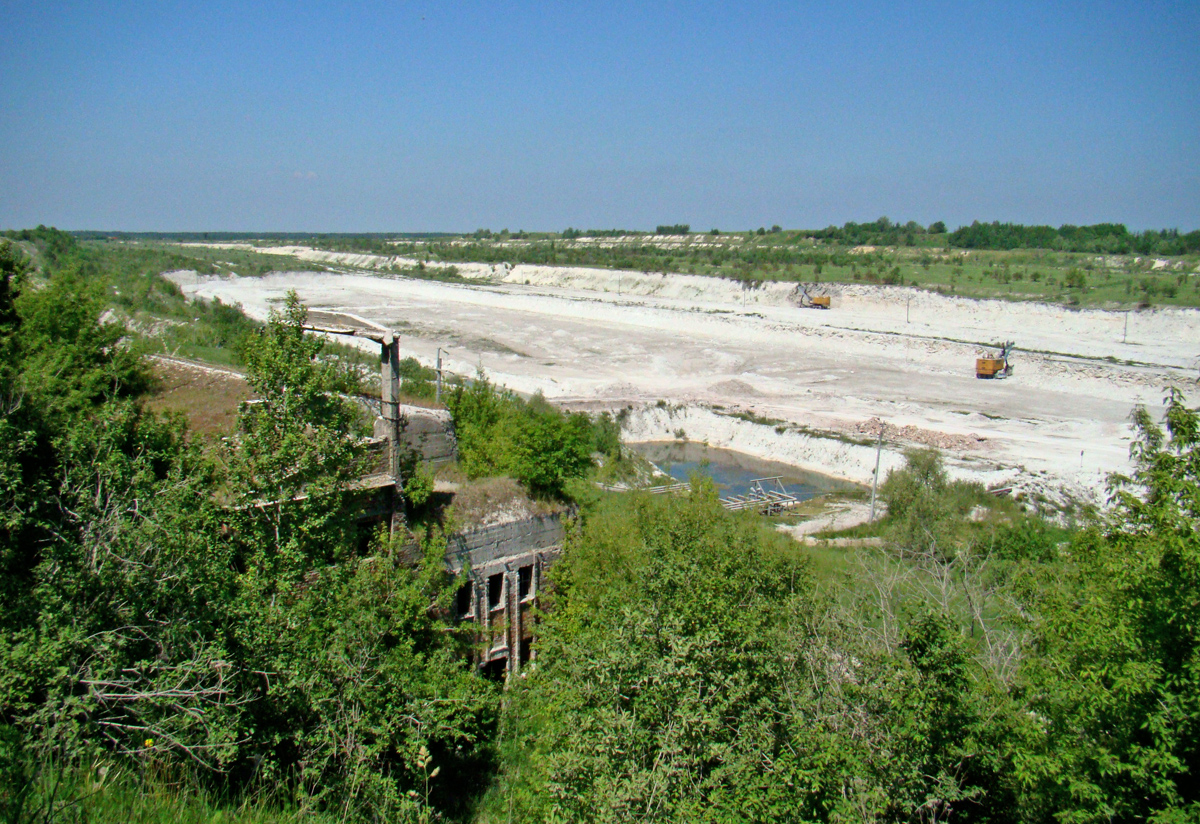

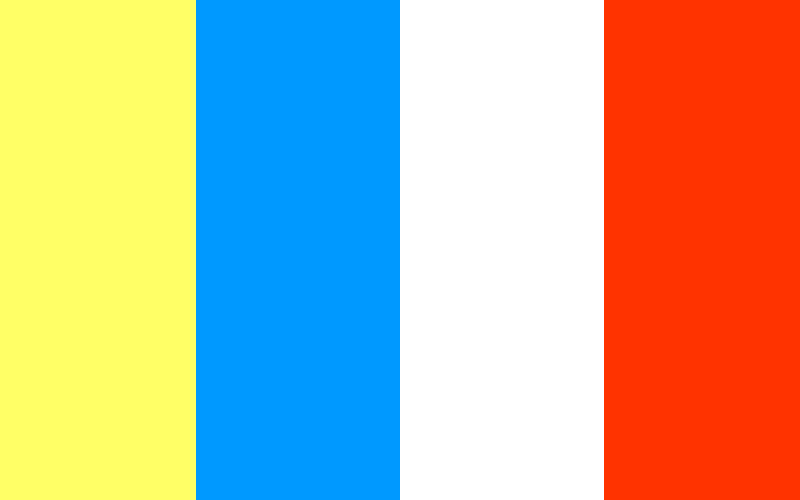
- Flag Coat of arms

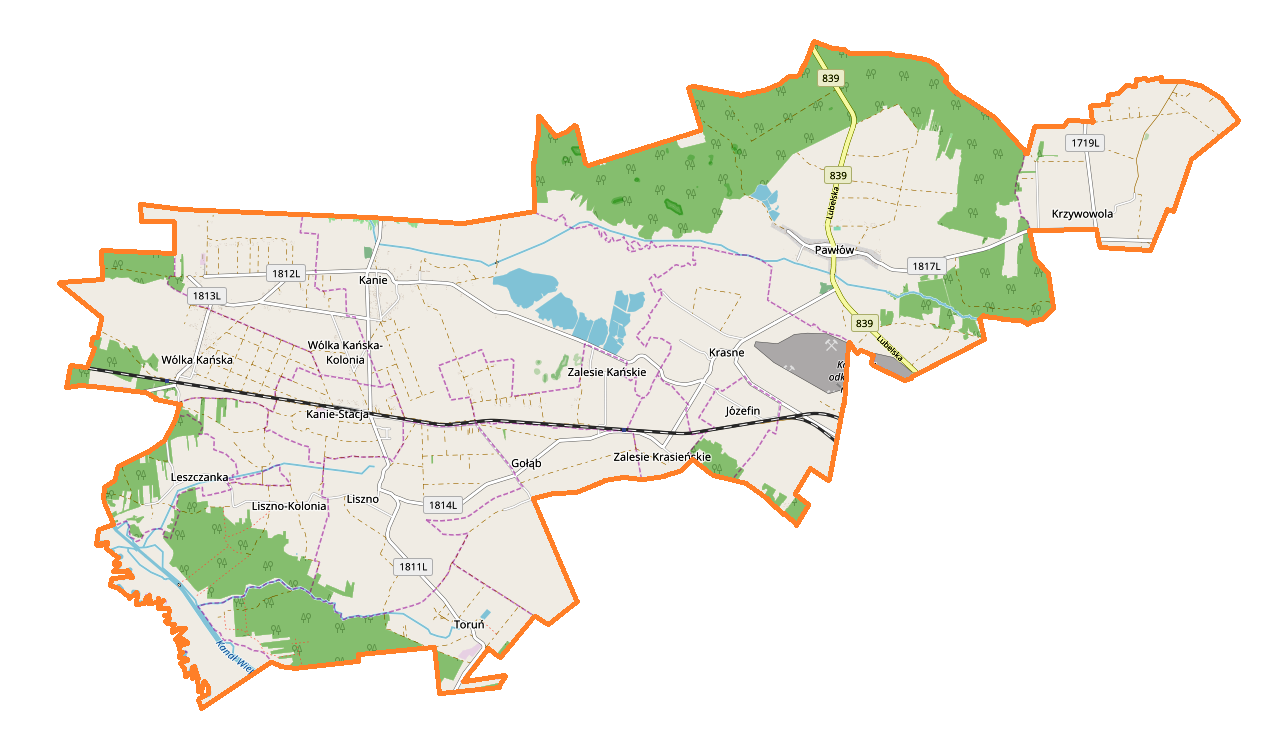
- Coordinates (Rejowiec Fabryczny): 51°7′10″N 23°14′42″E
- Country: Poland
- Voivodeship: Lublin
- County: Chełm County
- Seat: Rejowiec Fabryczny

Area
  - Total: 87.51 km^{2} (33.79 sq mi)

Population (2006)
  - Total: 4,657
  - Density: 53.22/km^{2} (137.8/sq mi)
- Website: http://www.ug.rejowiec.pl/

Gmina Rejowiec Fabryczny is a rural gmina (administrative district) in Chełm County, Lublin Voivodeship, in eastern Poland. Its seat is the town of Rejowiec Fabryczny, although the town is not part of the territory of the gmina.

The gmina covers an area of 87.51 square kilometres (33.8 sq mi), and as of 2006 its total population is 4,657.

== Villages ==
Gmina Rejowiec Fabryczny contains the villages and settlements of Gołąb, Józefin, Kanie-Stacja, Krasne, Krzywowola, Leszczanka, Liszno, Liszno-Kolonia, Pawłów, Toruń, Wólka Kańska, Wólka Kańska-Kolonia, Zalesie Kańskie and Zalesie Krasieńskie.

== Neighbouring gminas ==
Gmina Rejowiec Fabryczny is bordered by the town of Rejowiec Fabryczny and by the gminas of Łopiennik Górny, Rejowiec, Siedliszcze and Trawniki.
