= Torun (disambiguation) =

Toruń is a city in Poland.

Torun or Toruń may also refer to:

== Places ==
Poland

- Toruń, Lublin Voivodeship, a village in eastern Poland
- Stary Toruń, a village near the city
- Toruń County, an administrative unit in Poland based on the city
- Toruń Voivodeship, a former administrative unit in Poland based on the city
- Toruń (parliamentary constituency), a Polish parliamentary constituency based on the city

United States

- Torun, Wisconsin, an unincorporated community

== People ==
- Władysław Toruń (1889–1924), Polish military pilot and aviation pioneer
- Sviatlana Sudak Torun (born 1971), Belarusian-born Turkish hammer thrower
- Tunay Torun (born 1990), German-born Turkish footballer
- Vivianna Torun Bülow-Hübe (1927–2004), Swedish silversmith and master jeweller

== Name ==
- An Old Norse female given name meaning "Beloved of Thor"

== Other ==
- 12999 Toruń - main-belt asteroid
