= Wojciech Łuka =

Polish painter & illustrator (born 1958)

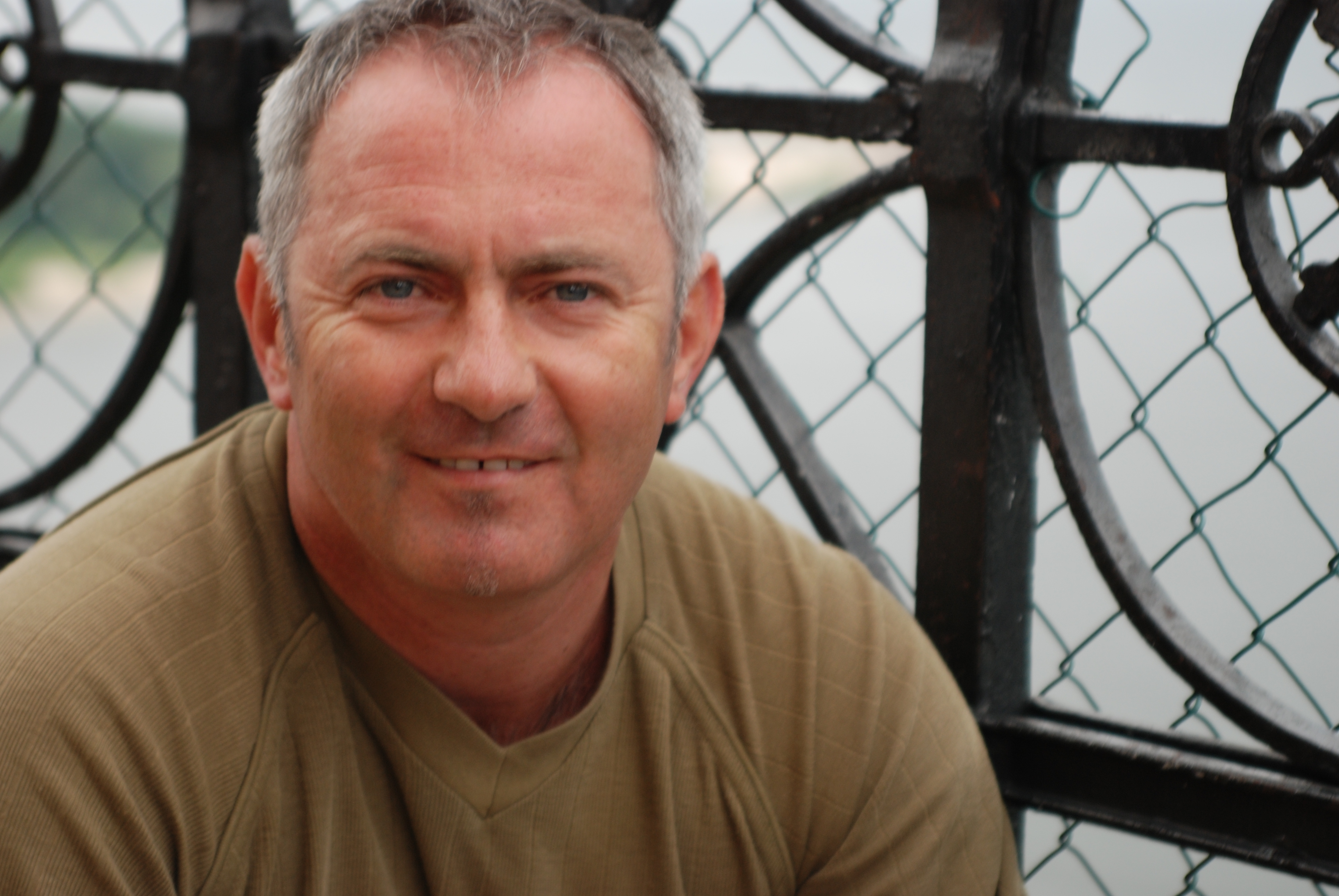
- Wojtek Łuka
- Born: Wojciech Łuka; 10 March 1958 (age 68); Rejowiec Fabryczny, Poland
- Education: Kraków Academy of Art
- Known for: Painter, illustrator
- Awards: Decoration for Merit to Polish Culture (2010)

Wojciech Łuka (born 10 March 1958 in Rejowiec Fabryczny) is a Polish painter, illustrator, mostly known for his portraits and subtle scenes of historical or religious significance. He is also connected with posters, book illustrations, scenography and adverts. He has works with Polish and foreign magazines, in which he has published more than 2000 of his drawings.

Łuka studied graphics at the Academy of Fine Arts in Kraków. He graduated from the atelier of Stanisław Kluska in Katowice.

In 2005 in Tychy he opened his own an art school under the name Skup Kultury.

== Works by Łuka ==
=== Painting ===
Wojciech Łuka he has authored of miniature battle paintings illustrating notable events from military history, as reflects by a sample miniature oil painting of Battle of Racławice. Visual artist, in the past urban visual arts in the Tychy, is noted for his paintings, sketches, murals (The Wisdom Tree), and other objets d'art.

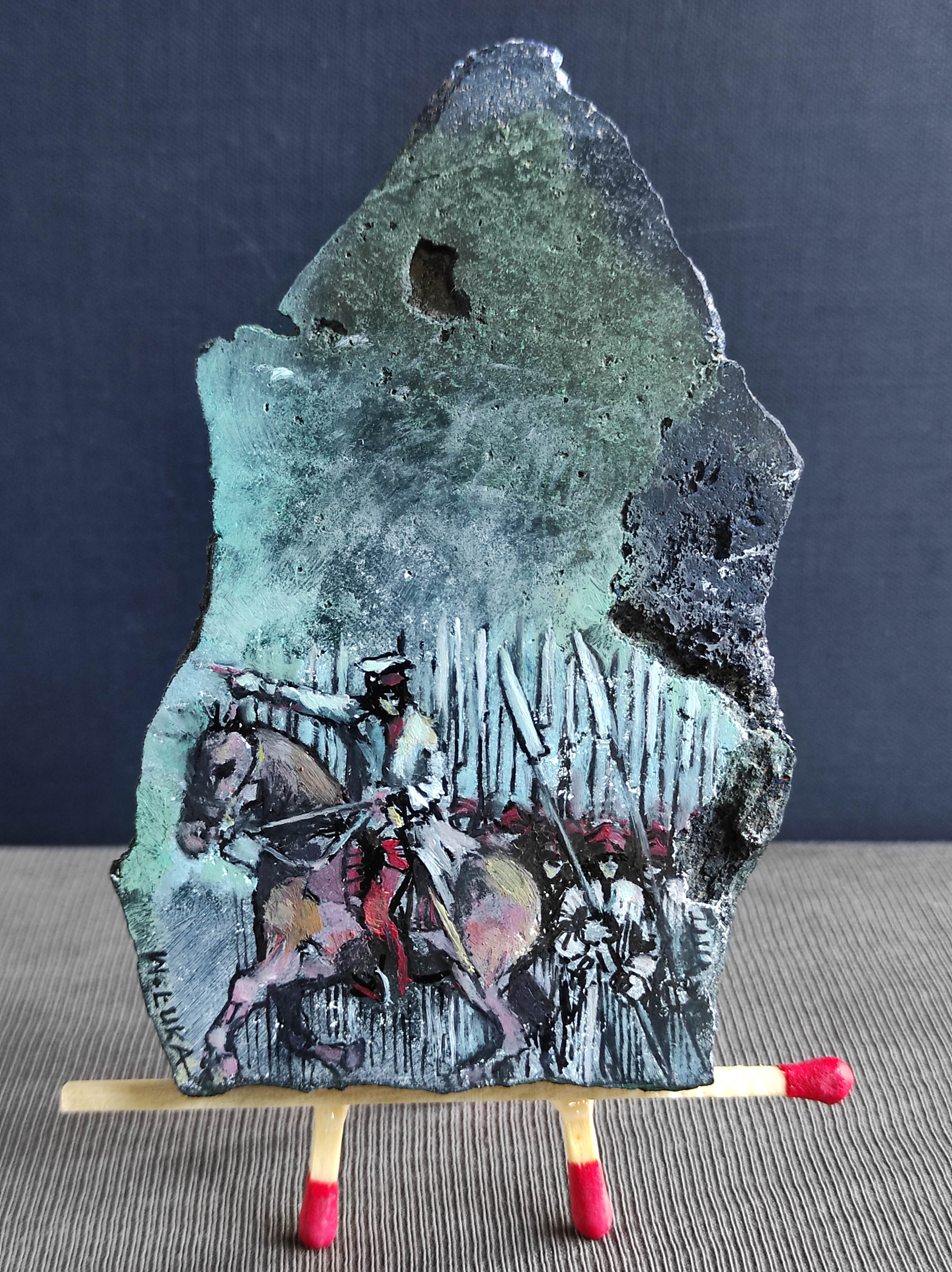
Battle of Racławice; 2023; oil on malachite and lapis lazuli; 132 × 77 mm, Muzeum Miniaturowej Sztuki Profesjonalnej Henryk Jan Dominiak in Tychy

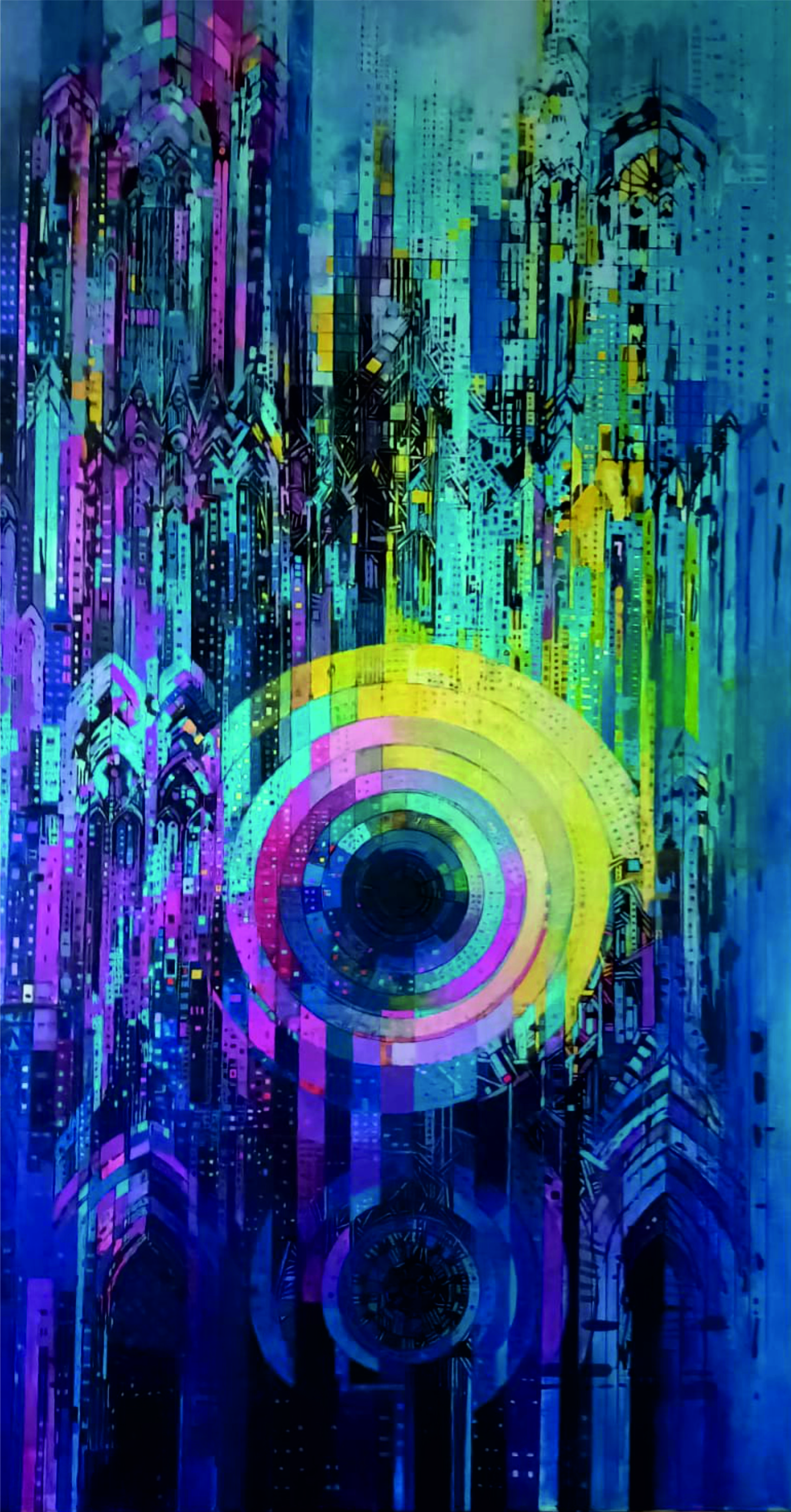
Rosette from the Cathedral series; 2021; oil on canvas

=== Drawing ===
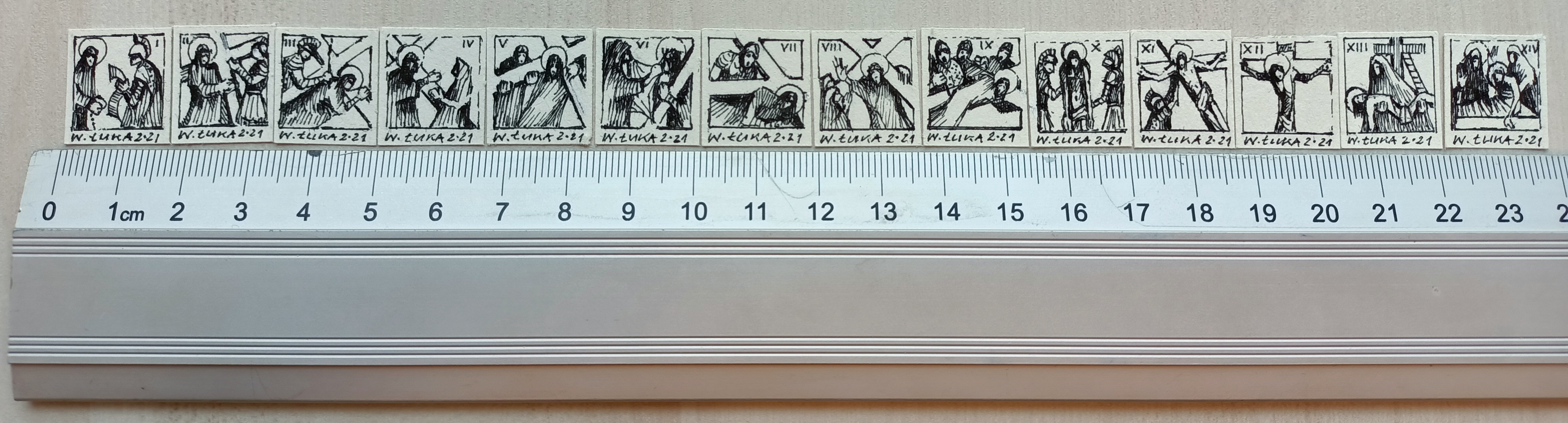
The Stations of the Cross (is one of the smallest in the world); 2021; black ink on paper; a set of the traditional 14 scenes (14 a squares 15 x 15 mm) from Muzeum Miniaturowej Sztuki Profesjonalnej Henryk Jan Dominiak in Tychy.

== Permanent exhibitions in the museums's ==
- Muzeum Archidiecezjalne in Katowice
- Museum of Cieszyn Silesia
- Muzeum Miniaturowej Sztuki Profesjonalnej Henryk Jan Dominiak in Tychy

In addition to exhibitions in several public collections, Wojtek Łuka's works are in many private collections in the Poland and abroad including United States, Canada, Germany, Italy, Egypt, United Kingdom and Sweden.

== Awards ==
And achieved many awards for his works and became famous.

- The award in arts awarded by the Ministry of Culture and National Heritage of the Republic of Poland the Decoration of Honor Meritorious for Polish Culture (2010);
- The Decoration of Honor Meritorious for Silesian Voivodeship;
- The award of the Mayor of Tychy for distinguished contributions to the culture and heritage (2016).
