= Julian Pękala =

Polish Old Catholic bishop (1904–1977)

- Bishop of the Polish Catholic Church
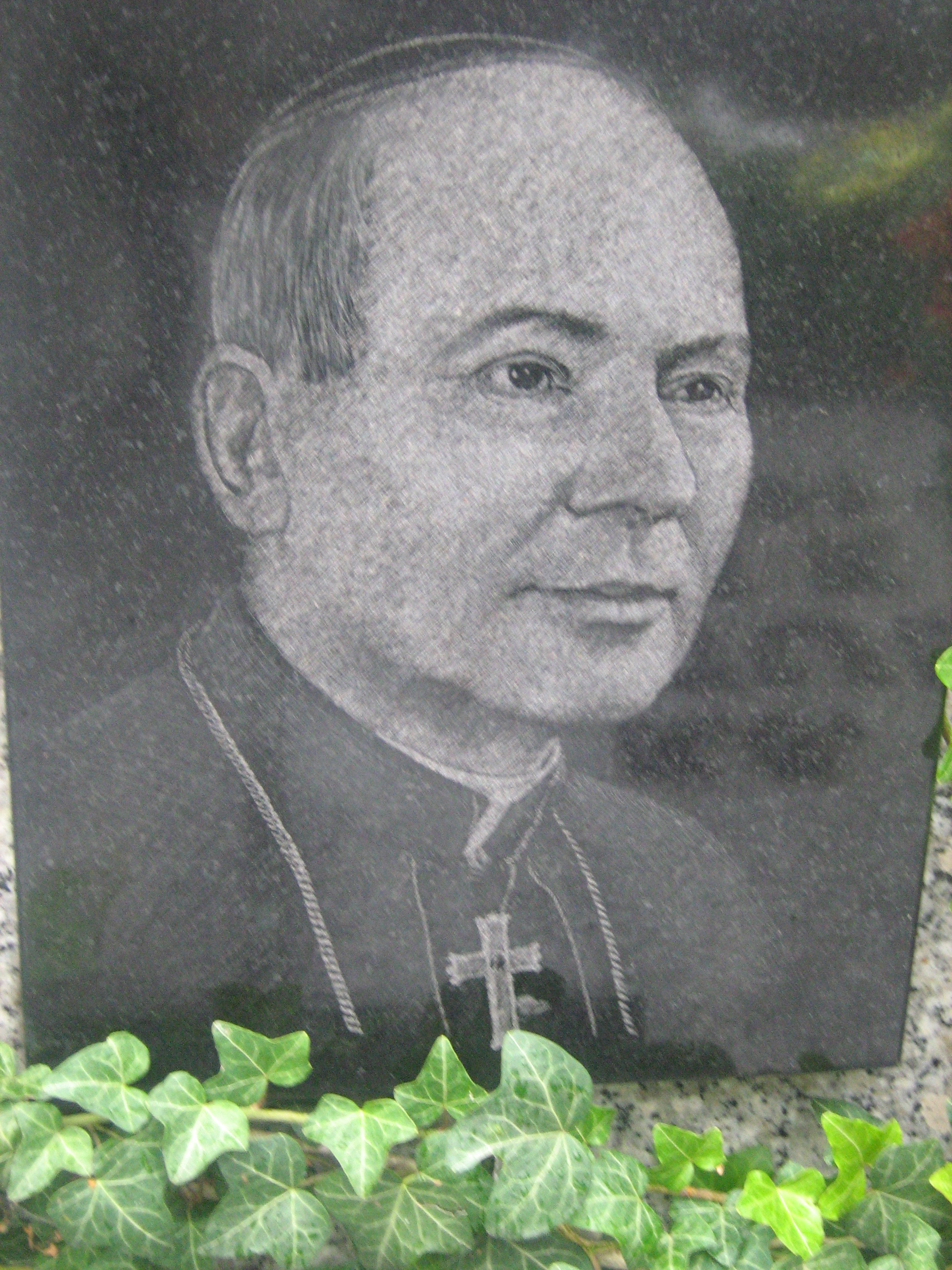
- Church: Polish Catholic Church
- Elected: 1951
- Previous posts: Primate Bishop of the Polish Catholic Church (1957‍–‍1959, 1965–1975); Ordinary of the Wrocław Diocese of the Polish Catholic Church (1963‍–‍1965)

Orders
- Ordination: July 9, 1928 by Francis Hodur of the Polish National Catholic Church
- Consecration: 1952 by Roman Maria Jakub Próchniewski of the Old Catholic Mariavite Church

Personal details
- Born: 1904 Dębowierzchy, Congress Poland
- Died: March 3, 1977 (aged 72–73) Warsaw, Poland

Julian Pękala (1904 – March 3, 1977, in Warsaw, Poland) was the Primate Bishop of the Polish Catholic Church from 1951 to 1959 as president of the episcopal college, and Primate Bishop from 1965 to 1975. From 1951 to 1959, he was the parish priest of the Cathedral Parish of the Holy Spirit in Warsaw. From March 23, 1961, to October 29, 1965, he served as the bishop ordinary of the Wrocław diocese of the Polish Catholic Church.

== Biography ==
Pękala was born 1904 in Dębowierzchy, Congress Poland. In 1928, he received priestly ordination in Krakow from Bishop Francis Hodur of the Polish National Catholic Church. As a pastor, he worked in parishes such as the Parish of St. John the Baptist in Święciechowo, Szewna, the Parish of Our Lady of Victory in Chełm, the Parish of the Good Shepherd in Henryków (Warsaw), and the Parish of the Assumption of the Blessed Virgin Mary in Lublin.

He was consecrated a bishop in 1952 by Bishop Roman Maria Jakub Próchniewski of the Old Catholic Mariavite Church with the assistance of Bishop Wacław Maria Bartłomiej Przysiecki (also of the Old Catholic Mariavite Church) and Bishop Adam Jurgielewicz (of the Polish Catholic Church).

In October 1965, Bishop Pękala organized a secret meeting of clergy at his apartment, where the decision was made to remove Primate Bishop Maksymilian Rode from office. The authorities supported this decision and ordered his immediate resignation. On November 1, 1965, Primate Bishop Maksymilian Rode officially resigned from the office of the Primate of the Polish Catholic Church. After the abrupt removal of Bishop Rode from the church leadership with the involvement of the Prime Bishop of the Polish National Catholic Church in the United States and Canada Leon Grochowski, Bishop Julian Pękala was once again appointed as the head of the Church. He is buried in the Powązki Military Cemetery in Warsaw (section D-11-5)
