= Krasne, Gmina Rejowiec Fabryczny =

Krasne
- Village
- Location within Poland
- Coordinates: 51°08′00″N 23°11′34″E
- Country: Poland
- Voivodeship: Lublin
- County: Chełm
- Gmina: Rejowiec Fabryczny

Krasne [ˈkrasnɛ] is a village in the administrative district of Gmina Rejowiec Fabryczny, within Chełm County, Lublin Voivodeship, in eastern Poland.
