= Gmina Trzebieszów =

Area in Poland

Gmina Trzebieszów Trzebieszów Commune
- Gmina
- Coat of arms
- Interactive map of Gmina Trzebieszów
- Coordinates (Trzebieszów): 51°59′N 22°33′E
- Country: Poland
- Voivodeship: Lublin
- County: Łuków
- Seat: Trzebieszów

Area
  - Total: 140.45 km^{2} (54.23 sq mi)

Population (2006)
  - Total: 7,601
  - Density: 54.12/km^{2} (140.2/sq mi)
- Website: Official website

Gmina Trzebieszów is a rural gmina (administrative district) in Łuków County, Lublin Voivodeship, in eastern Poland. Its seat is the village of Trzebieszów, which lies approximately 14 kilometres (9 mi) north-east of Łuków and 82 km (51 mi) north of the regional capital Lublin.

The gmina covers an area of 140.45 square kilometres (54.2 sq mi), and as of 2006 its total population is 7,601.

== Villages ==
Gmina Trzebieszów contains the villages and settlements of Celiny, Dębowica, Dębowierzchy, Gołowierzchy, Jakusze, Karwów, Kurów, Leszczanka, Mikłusy, Nurzyna, Płudy, Ryndy, Salamony, Sierakówka, Świercze, Szaniawy-Matysy, Szaniawy-Poniaty, Trzebieszów, Trzebieszów Drugi, Trzebieszów Pierwszy, Trzebieszów-Kolonia, Wierzejki, Wólka Konopna, Wylany, Zaolszynie and Zembry.

== Neighbouring gminas ==
Gmina Trzebieszów is bordered by the gminas of Kąkolewnica Wschodnia, Łuków, Międzyrzec Podlaski and Zbuczyn.

== Controversies ==
A community of 83 Jews lived in the Trzebieszów municipality in the interwar period. This community ceased to exist in 1942, when, on the order of the Germans, the peasants of Trzebieszów caught the local Jews and carried them on wagons to the ghetto in nearby Łuków. Jewish property was plundered by the locals. Jews from Trzebieszów shared the fate of other Jews from the ghetto, they were murdered in Treblinka or shot in the ghetto.

On the 18th of June 2019 Gmina Trzebieszów has adopted an LGBT-free zone resolution.
