= Szaniawy-Poniaty =

- Village
- Location within Poland
- Coordinates: 51°56′57″N 22°31′56″E
- Country: Poland
- Voivodeship: Lublin
- County: Łuków
- Gmina: Trzebieszów
- Population: 700

Szaniawy-Poniaty [ʂaˈɲavɨ pɔˈɲatɨ] is a village in the administrative district of Gmina Trzebieszów, within Łuków County, Lublin Voivodeship, in eastern Poland.
