= Trzebieszów-Kolonia =

- Village
- Location within Poland
- Coordinates: 51°59′45″N 22°34′09″E
- Country: Poland
- Voivodeship: Lublin
- County: Łuków
- Gmina: Trzebieszów

Trzebieszów-Kolonia [tʂɛˈbjɛʂuf kɔˈlɔɲa] is a village in the administrative district of Gmina Trzebieszów, within Łuków County, Lublin Voivodeship, in eastern Poland.
