= Kanie-Stacja =

- Village
- Location within Poland
- Coordinates: 51°7′27″N 23°6′22″E
- Country: Poland
- Voivodeship: Lublin
- County: Chełm
- Gmina: Rejowiec Fabryczny

Kanie-Stacja [ˈkaɲɛ ˈstat͡sja] is a village in the administrative district of Gmina Rejowiec Fabryczny, within Chełm County, Lublin Voivodeship, in eastern Poland.
