= Wierzejki =

- Village
- Location within Poland
- Coordinates: 52°2′N 22°34′E
- Country: Poland
- Voivodeship: Lublin
- County: Łuków
- Gmina: Trzebieszów

Wierzejki [vjɛˈʐɛi̯ki] is a village in the administrative district of Gmina Trzebieszów, within Łuków County, Lublin Voivodeship, in eastern Poland.
