= Nurzyna =

- Village
- Location within Poland
- Coordinates: 51°57′52″N 22°27′35″E
- Country: Poland
- Voivodeship: Lublin
- County: Łuków
- Gmina: Trzebieszów
- Elevation: 127 m (417 ft)
- Population (approx.): 400

Nurzyna [nuˈʐɨna] is a village in the administrative district of Gmina Trzebieszów, within Łuków County, Lublin Voivodeship, in eastern Poland.
