= Trzebieszów Drugi =

- Village
- Location within Poland
- Coordinates: 51°59′16″N 22°32′43″E
- Country: Poland
- Voivodeship: Lublin
- County: Łuków
- Gmina: Trzebieszów

Trzebieszów Drugi [tʂɛˈbjɛʂuf ˈdruɡi] is a village in the administrative district of Gmina Trzebieszów, within Łuków County, Lublin Voivodeship, in eastern Poland.
