= Dębowica =

- Village
- Location within Poland
- Coordinates: 51°57′N 22°28′E
- Country: Poland
- Voivodeship: Lublin
- County: Łuków
- Gmina: Trzebieszów

Dębowica [dɛmbɔˈvit͡sa] is a village in the administrative district of Gmina Trzebieszów, within Łuków County, Lublin Voivodeship, in eastern Poland.
