= Wólka Kańska-Kolonia =

- Village
- Location within Poland
- Coordinates: 51°08′04″N 23°06′12″E
- Country: Poland
- Voivodeship: Lublin
- County: Chełm
- Gmina: Rejowiec Fabryczny

Wólka Kańska-Kolonia [ˈvulka ˈkaɲska kɔˈlɔɲa] is a village in the administrative district of Gmina Rejowiec Fabryczny, within Chełm County, Lublin Voivodeship, in eastern Poland.
