= Celiny, Lublin Voivodeship =

Celiny
- Village
- Location within Poland
- Coordinates: 51°59′37″N 22°27′58″E
- Country: Poland
- Voivodeship: Lublin
- County: Łuków
- Gmina: Trzebieszów

Celiny [t͡sɛˈlinɨ] is a village in the administrative district of Gmina Trzebieszów, within Łuków County, Lublin Voivodeship, in eastern Poland.
