= Wólka Kańska =

- Village
- Location within Poland
- Coordinates: 51°8′N 23°5′E
- Country: Poland
- Voivodeship: Lublin
- County: Chełm
- Gmina: Rejowiec Fabryczny

Wólka Kańska [ˈvulka ˈkaɲska] is a village in the administrative district of Gmina Rejowiec Fabryczny, within Chełm County, Lublin Voivodeship, in eastern Poland.
