= Pawłów, Chełm County =

Pawłów
- Village
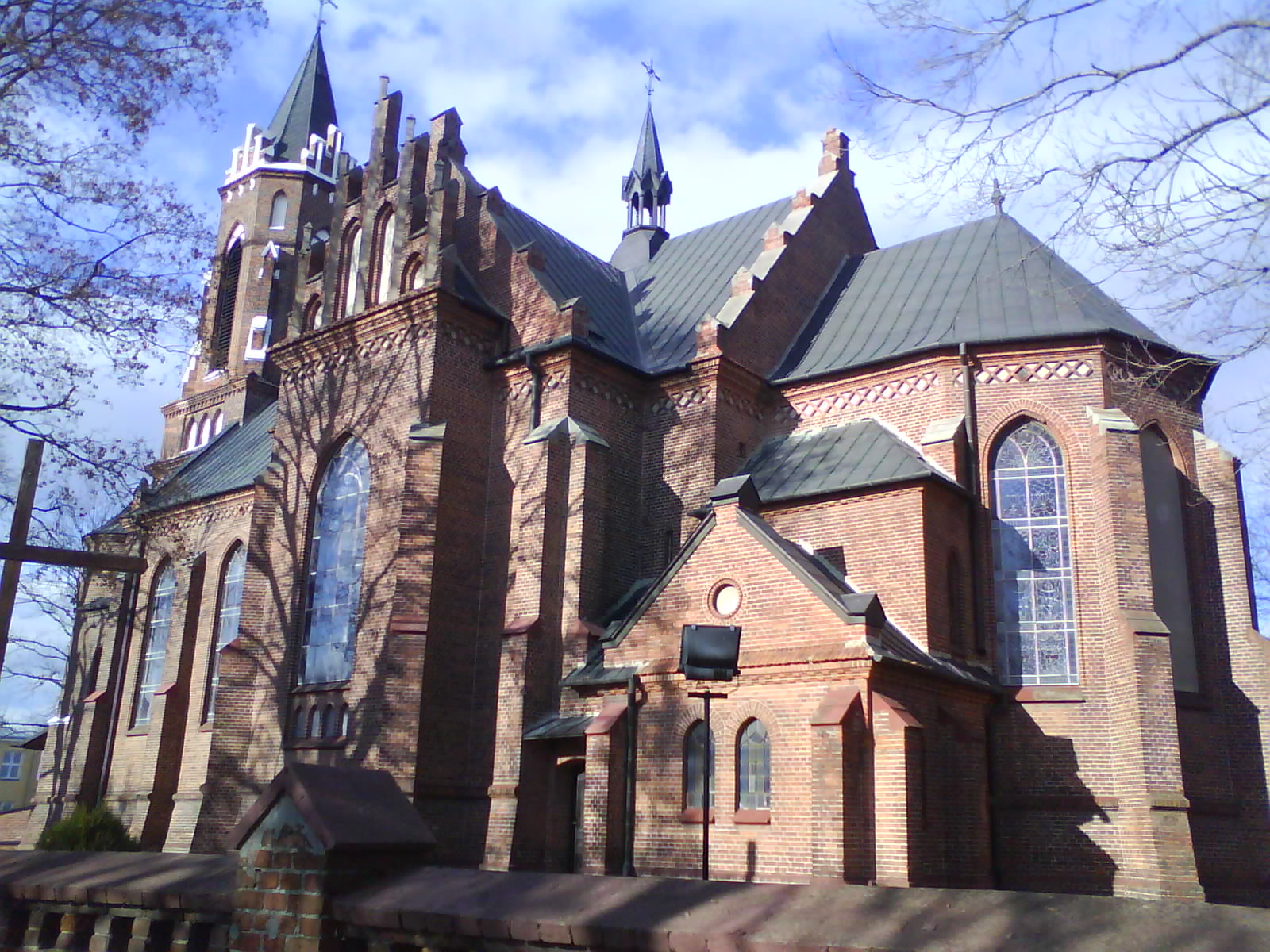
- Saint John the Baptist Church

- Location within Poland
- Coordinates: 51°8′46″N 23°12′44″E
- Country: Poland
- Voivodeship: Lublin
- County: Chełm
- Gmina: Rejowiec Fabryczny

Population
  - Total: 960

Pawłów [ˈpavwuf] is a village in the administrative district of Gmina Rejowiec Fabryczny, within Chełm County, Lublin Voivodeship, in eastern Poland.
