= Karwów, Lublin Voivodeship =

Karwów
- Village
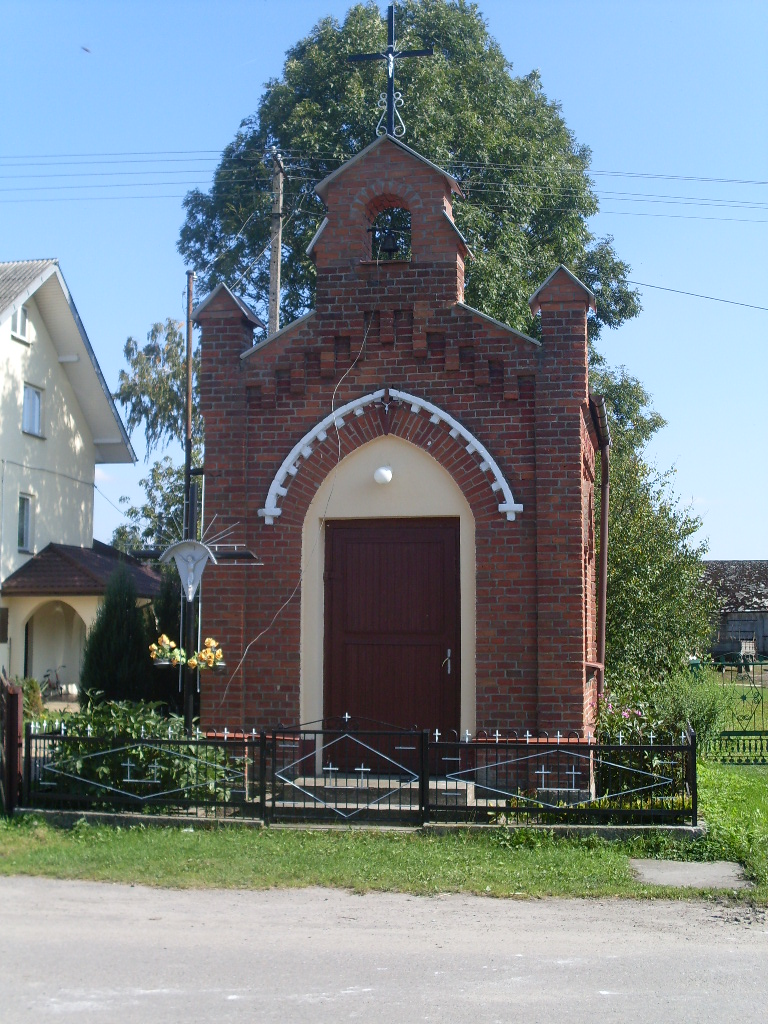

- Location within Poland
- Coordinates: 51°59′00″N 22°30′00″E
- Country: Poland
- Voivodeship: Lublin
- County: Łuków
- Gmina: Trzebieszów

Karwów [ˈkarvuf] is a village in the administrative district of Gmina Trzebieszów, within Łuków County, Lublin Voivodeship, in eastern Poland.
