= Wylany =

- Village
- Location within Poland
- Coordinates: 52°1′N 22°32′E
- Country: Poland
- Voivodeship: Lublin
- County: Łuków
- Gmina: Trzebieszów

Wylany [vɨˈlanɨ] is a village in the administrative district of Gmina Trzebieszów, within Łuków County, Lublin Voivodeship, in eastern Poland.
