= Ryndy =

- Settlement
- Location within Poland
- Coordinates: 51°56′59″N 22°31′39″E
- Country: Poland
- Voivodeship: Lublin
- County: Łuków
- Gmina: Trzebieszów

Ryndy [ˈrɨndɨ] is a settlement in the administrative district of Gmina Trzebieszów, within Łuków County, Lublin Voivodeship, in eastern Poland.
