= Trzebieszów Pierwszy =

- Village
- Location within Poland
- Coordinates: 51°58′52″N 22°31′37″E
- Country: Poland
- Voivodeship: Lublin
- County: Łuków
- Gmina: Trzebieszów

Trzebieszów Pierwszy [tʂɛˈbjɛʂuf ˈpjɛrfʂɨ] is a village in the administrative district of Gmina Trzebieszów, within Łuków County, Lublin Voivodeship, in eastern Poland.
