= Marcin Firlej =

Polish journalist (born 1975)

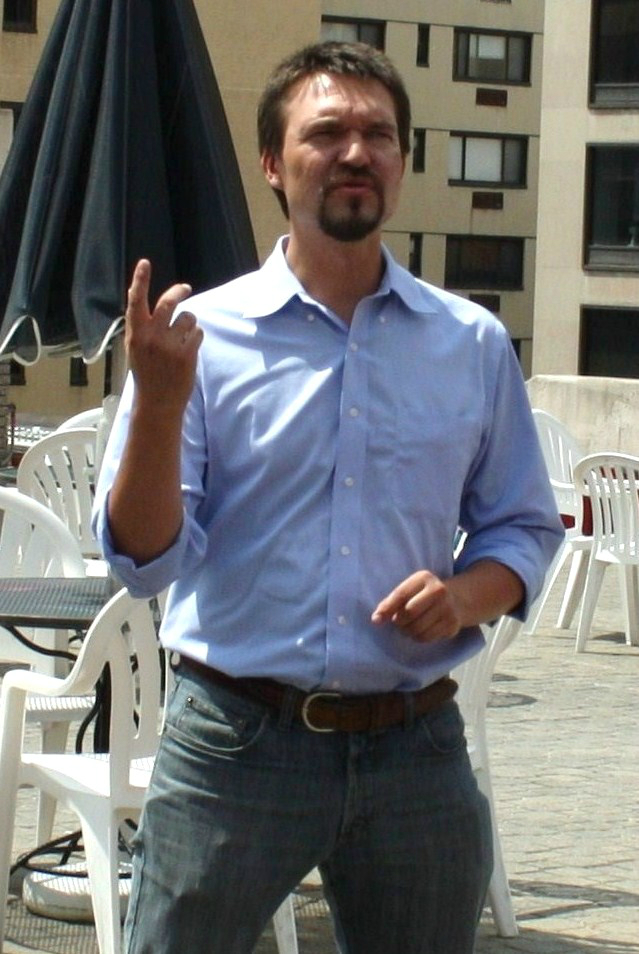
- Wikimania 2012 in Washington, DC
- Born: May 4, 1975 (age 51); Rejowiec Fabryczny, Lublin Voivodeship, Poland
- Occupations: Journalist; investigative reporter; war correspondent
- Writing career
- Years active: 2001-present

Marcin Firlej (born May 4, 1975, in Rejowiec Fabryczny) is a Polish journalist, writer and war correspondent.

== Career ==
As of April 2009, he is a permanent correspondent of the public Polish Television (TVP) in Washington, DC. He previously worked as a war correspondent for TVN24 (2001–2008) and investigative reporter for RMF FM radio (2005–2008). He covered wars in Iraq, Afghanistan and Gaza Strip.

April 8, 2003 Marcin Firlej with Jacek Kaczmarek (Polskie Radio – public Polish Radio) were captured by Republican Guard gunmen near Al-Hillah in Central Iraq. During imprisonment, the two journalists were taken to a school where they were interrogated and accused of spying. They escaped the next day during the American attack on the city.

== Works ==
He is the co-author of a book about the war in Iraq "Szum skrzydel Azraela" ("The Rustle of The Azrael Wings" ISBN 83-7298-543-X) and the director and scriptwriter of two documentary films about Afghanistan (shown in Discovery Historia, 2008).

== See also ==
- Television in Poland
