= Zalesie Kańskie =

- Village
- Location within Poland
- Coordinates: 51°07′38″N 23°08′39″E
- Country: Poland
- Voivodeship: Lublin
- County: Chełm
- Gmina: Rejowiec Fabryczny

Zalesie Kańskie [zaˈlɛɕɛ ˈkaɲskʲɛ] is a village in the administrative district of Gmina Rejowiec Fabryczny, within Chełm County, Lublin Voivodeship, in eastern Poland.
