= Józefin, Gmina Rejowiec Fabryczny =

Józefin
- Village
- Location within Poland
- Coordinates: 51°07′28″N 23°11′34″E
- Country: Poland
- Voivodeship: Lublin
- County: Chełm
- Gmina: Rejowiec Fabryczny

Józefin [juˈzɛfin] is a village in the administrative district of Gmina Rejowiec Fabryczny, within Chełm County, Lublin Voivodeship, in eastern Poland.
