= Szaniawy-Matysy =

- Village
- Location within Poland
- Coordinates: 51°56′15″N 22°29′58″E
- Country: Poland
- Voivodeship: Lublin
- County: Łuków
- Gmina: Trzebieszów
- Population: 500

Szaniawy-Matysy [ʂaˈɲavɨ maˈtɨsɨ] is a village in the administrative district of Gmina Trzebieszów, within Łuków County, Lublin Voivodeship, in eastern Poland.
