= Leszczanka, Łuków County =

Leszczanka
- Village
- Location within Poland
- Coordinates: 51°59′51″N 22°37′01″E
- Country: Poland
- Voivodeship: Lublin
- County: Łuków
- Gmina: Trzebieszów

Leszczanka [lɛʂˈt͡ʂanka] is a village in the administrative district of Gmina Trzebieszów, within Łuków County, Lublin Voivodeship, in eastern Poland.
