= Toruń, Lublin Voivodeship =

Toruń
- Village
- Location within Poland
- Coordinates: 51°05′46″N 23°07′47″E
- Country: Poland
- Voivodeship: Lublin
- County: Chełm
- Gmina: Rejowiec Fabryczny

Toruń (Polish pronunciation: [ˈtɔruj̃]) is a village in the administrative district of Gmina Rejowiec Fabryczny, within Chełm County, Lublin Voivodeship, in eastern Poland.
