= Leszczanka, Chełm County =

Leszczanka
- Village
- Location within Poland
- Coordinates: 51°7′N 23°4′E
- Country: Poland
- Voivodeship: Lublin
- County: Chełm
- Gmina: Rejowiec Fabryczny
- Time zone: UTC+1 (CET)
  - Summer (DST): UTC+2 (CEST)

Leszczanka [lɛʂˈt͡ʂanka] is a village in the administrative district of Gmina Rejowiec Fabryczny, within Chełm County, Lublin Voivodeship, in eastern Poland.

== History ==
Ten Polish citizens were murdered by Nazi Germany in the village during World War II.
