= Płudy, Łuków County =

Płudy
- Village
- Location within Poland
- Coordinates: 52°1′40″N 22°32′30″E
- Country: Poland
- Voivodeship: Lublin
- County: Łuków
- Gmina: Trzebieszów
- Population: 50

Płudy [ˈpwudɨ] is a village in the administrative district of Gmina Trzebieszów, within Łuków County, Lublin Voivodeship, in eastern Poland.
