= Rejowiec Fabryczny =

Town in Lublin Voivodeship, Poland

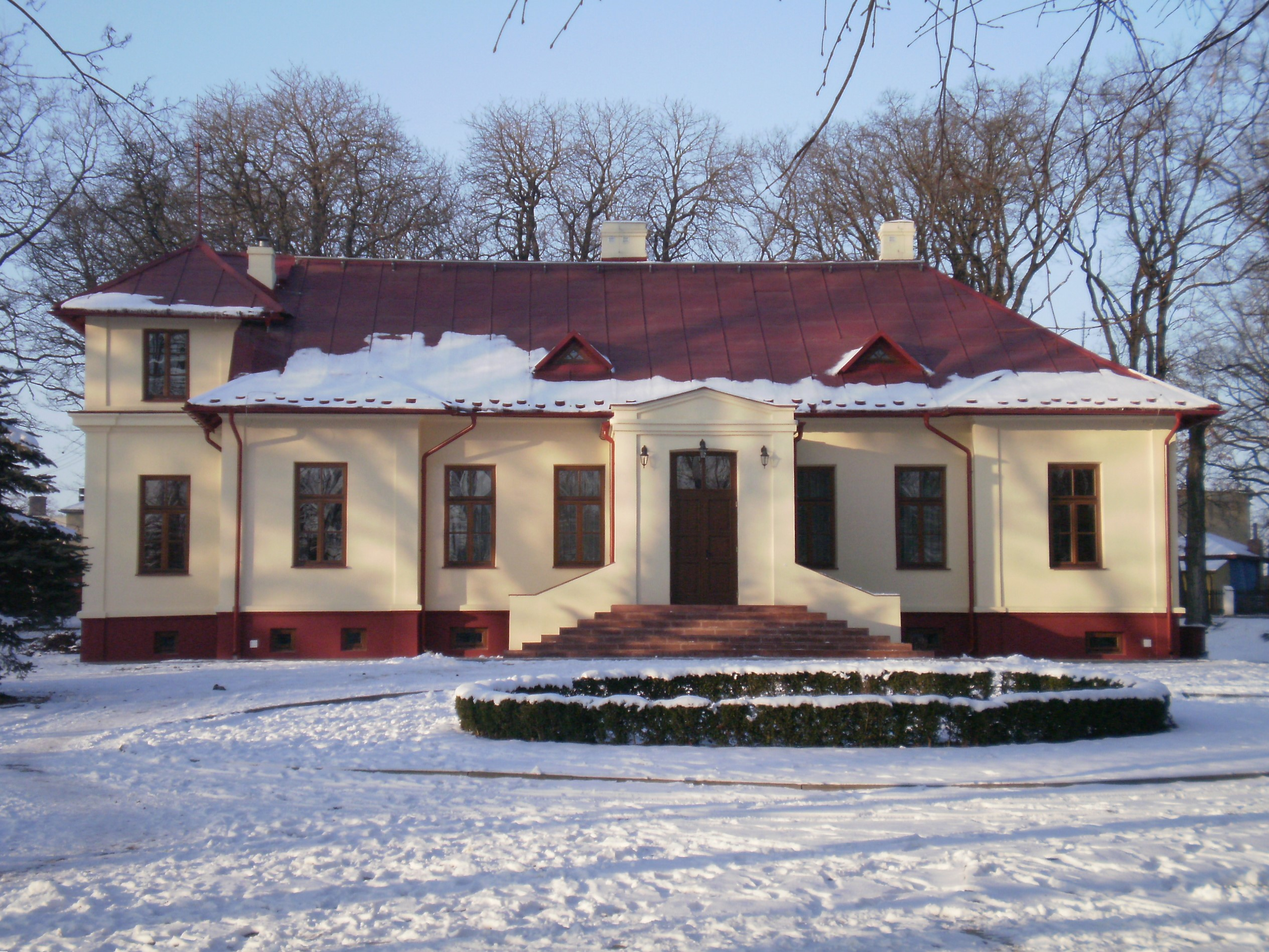
- Kiwerski Manor in Rejowiec Fabryczny

- Coat of arms

- Location within Poland
- Coordinates: 51°7′10″N 23°14′42″E
- Country: Poland
- Voivodeship: Lublin
- County: Chełm
- Gmina: Rejowiec Fabryczny (urban gmina)

Government
  - Mayor: Gabriel Adamiec

Area
  - Total: 14.28 km^{2} (5.51 sq mi)

Population (2016)
  - Total: 4,419
  - Density: 309.5/km^{2} (801.5/sq mi)
- Time zone: UTC+1 (CET)
  - Summer (DST): UTC+2 (CEST)
- Postal code: 22-170
- Car plates: LCH
- Website: www.rejowiec.pl

Rejowiec Fabryczny (Polish: [rɛˈjɔvjɛt͡s faˈbrɨt͡ʂnɨ]) is a town in eastern Poland, in Lublin Voivodeship, in Chełm County. It has 4,419 inhabitants (2016). Rejowiec Fabryczny is a rail junction, located on the main Warsaw-Lublin-Chełm connection. Also, another line originates in Rejowiec Fabryczny, which goes southwards to Zamość.

The town is a member of Cittaslow.

== History ==
First settlements located in what now is Rejowiec Fabryczny were mentioned in the 13th century document, when this area belonged to Kingdom of Galicia–Volhynia. In the mid-14th century, the region of Chełm was regained by Poland. For centuries, a folwark existed here, which belonged to several szlachta families, such as the Rejs and the Wojakowskis.

During the Third Partition of Poland in 1795, the area was annexed by Austria. After the Polish victory in the Austro-Polish War of 1809 it was regained by Poles and included within the short-lived Polish Duchy of Warsaw. Following the duchy's dissolution in 1815, it was part of the Russian-controlled Congress Poland. In March 1876, Krzysztof Morawski built here a manor house, surrounded by a park.

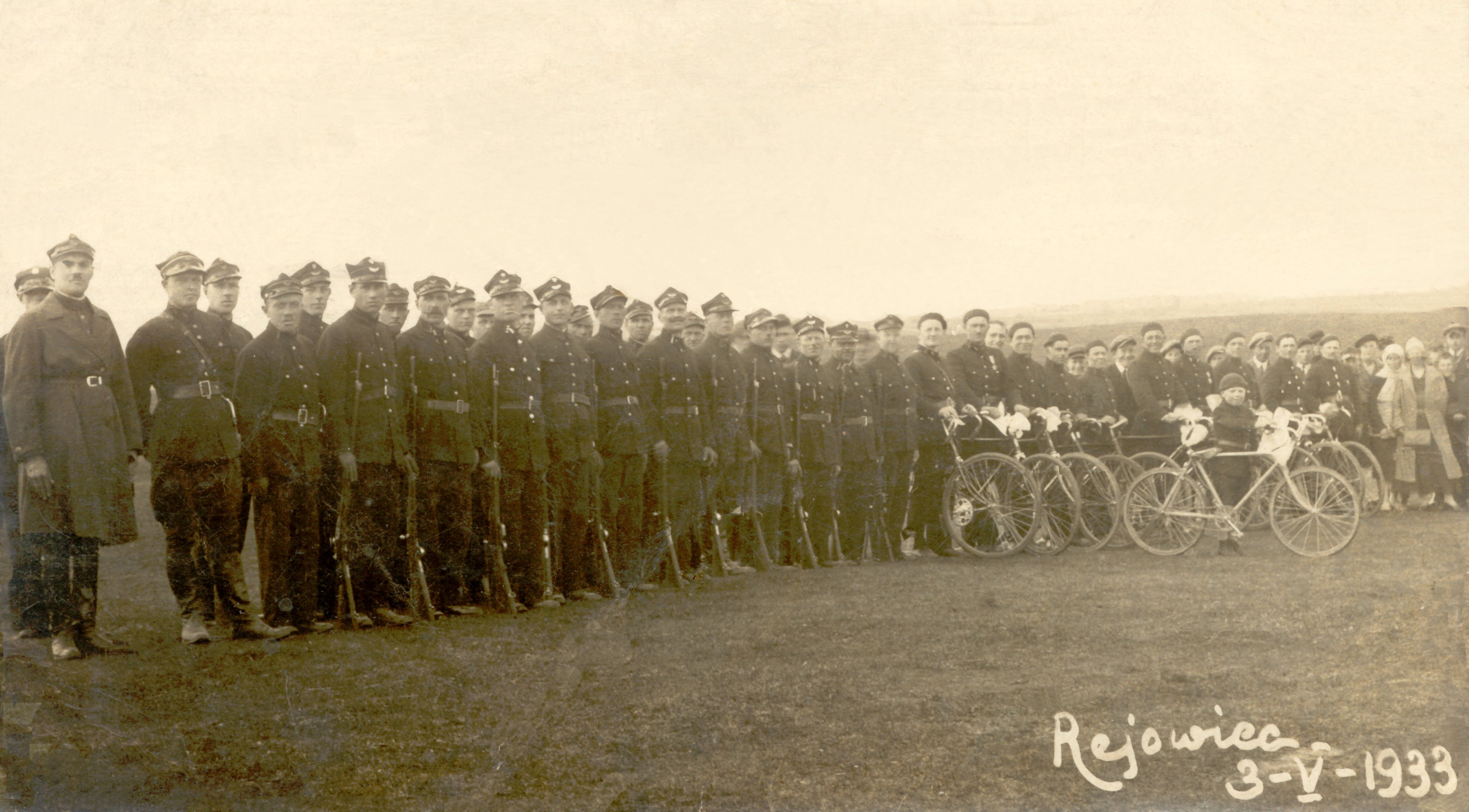
Railway station personnel in 1933

In 1878, the area of today’s Rejowiec Fabryczny was purchased by Society of the Vistula River Railroad, which in 1879–1880 built here a rail station. In 1914, Society of Lublin Portland Factory began construction of a cement plant. Due to World War I, the plant was not finished until 1924. Furthermore, two apartment blocks for workers were built in the Morawinek district.

Following the joint German-Soviet invasion of Poland, which started World War II in September 1939, the area was occupied by Germany until 1944.

The plant was expanded in 1951–1955, after which it produced 700,000 tons of cement annually. Following Communist custom, it was named “Peace”, and additional flats were added, which gave Rejowiec Fabryczny the status of osiedle. Finally, in 1962 Rejowiec Fabryczny was granted a town charter. In the 1960s and 1970s the newly established town quickly developed. New buildings were added and its population grew.

== Notable people ==
- Marcin Firlej (born 1975), Polish journalist, writer and war correspondent
