= Bačkov =

Bačkov may refer to:

- Bačkov (Havlíčkův Brod District), village and municipality in the Vysočina Region of the Czech Republic
- Bačkov, Trebišov District, village and municipality in Trebišov District, Slovakia

== See also ==
- Baczków (disambiguation)
