= Mysłów =

Mysłów may refer to the following places in Poland:

- Mysłów, Lower Silesian Voivodeship (south-west Poland)
- Mysłów, Lublin Voivodeship (east Poland)
- Mysłów, Silesian Voivodeship (south Poland)
