= Baczków =

Baczków may refer to:

- Baczków, Lesser Poland Voivodeship, a village in the administrative district of Gmina Bochnia, Bochnia County, Poland
- Baczków, Lublin Voivodeship, a village in the administrative district of Gmina Wola Mysłowska, Łuków County, Poland

== See also ==
- Bačkov (disambiguation)
