= Wola Mysłowska =

- Village
- Location within Poland
- Coordinates: 51°51′N 21°57′E
- Country: Poland
- Voivodeship: Lublin
- County: Łuków
- Gmina: Wola Mysłowska
- Population: 330

Wola Mysłowska [ˈvɔla mɨˈswɔfska] is a village in Łuków County, Lublin Voivodeship, in eastern Poland. It is the seat of the gmina (administrative district) called Gmina Wola Mysłowska.
