= Nowy Świat, Lublin Voivodeship =

Nowy Świat
- Village
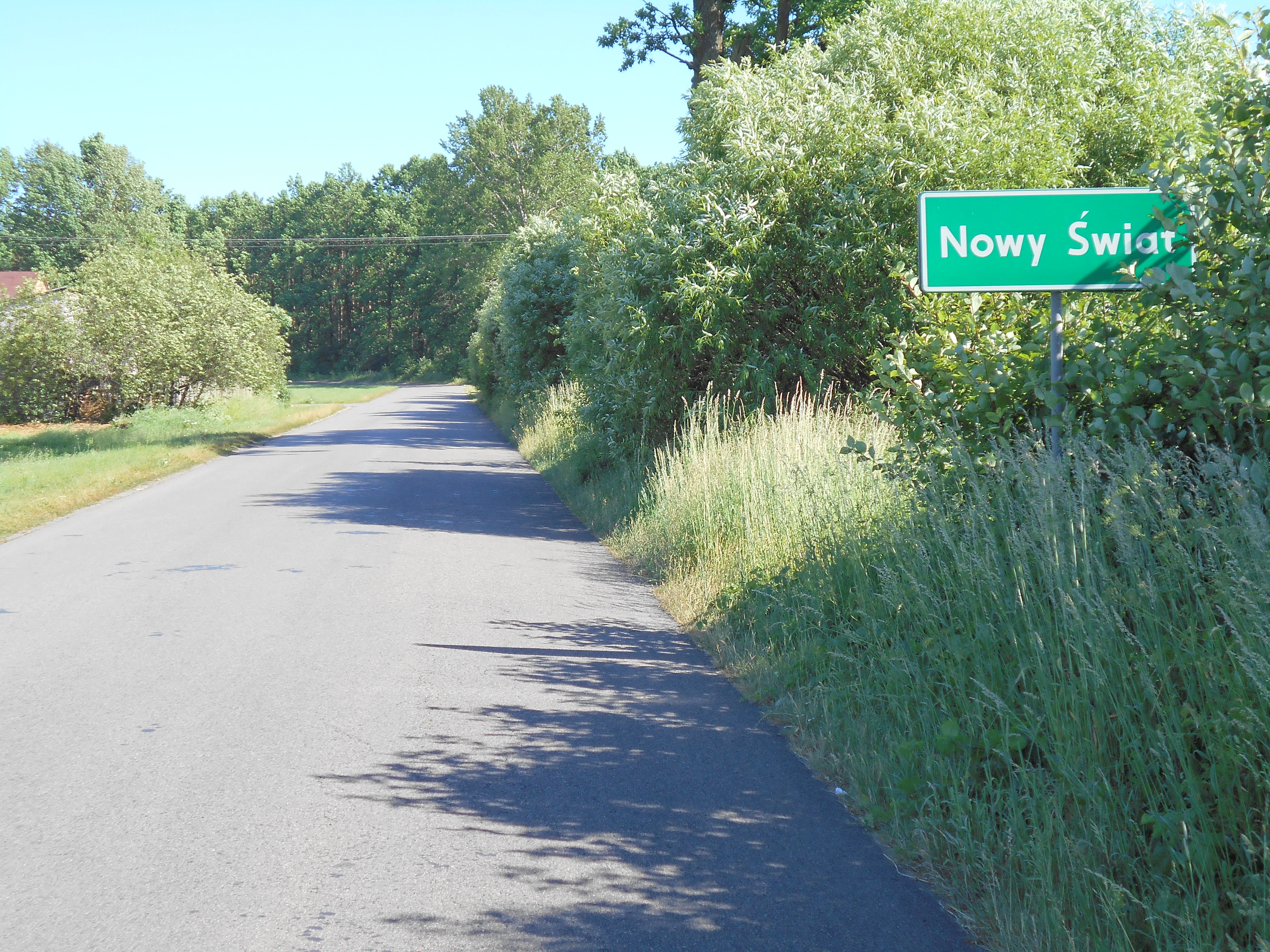

- Location within Poland
- Coordinates: 51°49′0″N 22°0′10″E
- Country: Poland
- Voivodeship: Lublin
- County: Łuków
- Gmina: Wola Mysłowska
- Time zone: UTC+1 (CET)
  - Summer (DST): UTC+2 (CEST)

Nowy Świat (Polish pronunciation: [ˈnɔvɨ ˈɕfjat]) is a village in the administrative district of Gmina Wola Mysłowska, within Łuków County, Lublin Voivodeship, in eastern Poland.

== History ==
Three Polish citizens were murdered by Nazi Germany in the village during World War II.
