= Osiny, Łuków County =

Osiny
- Village
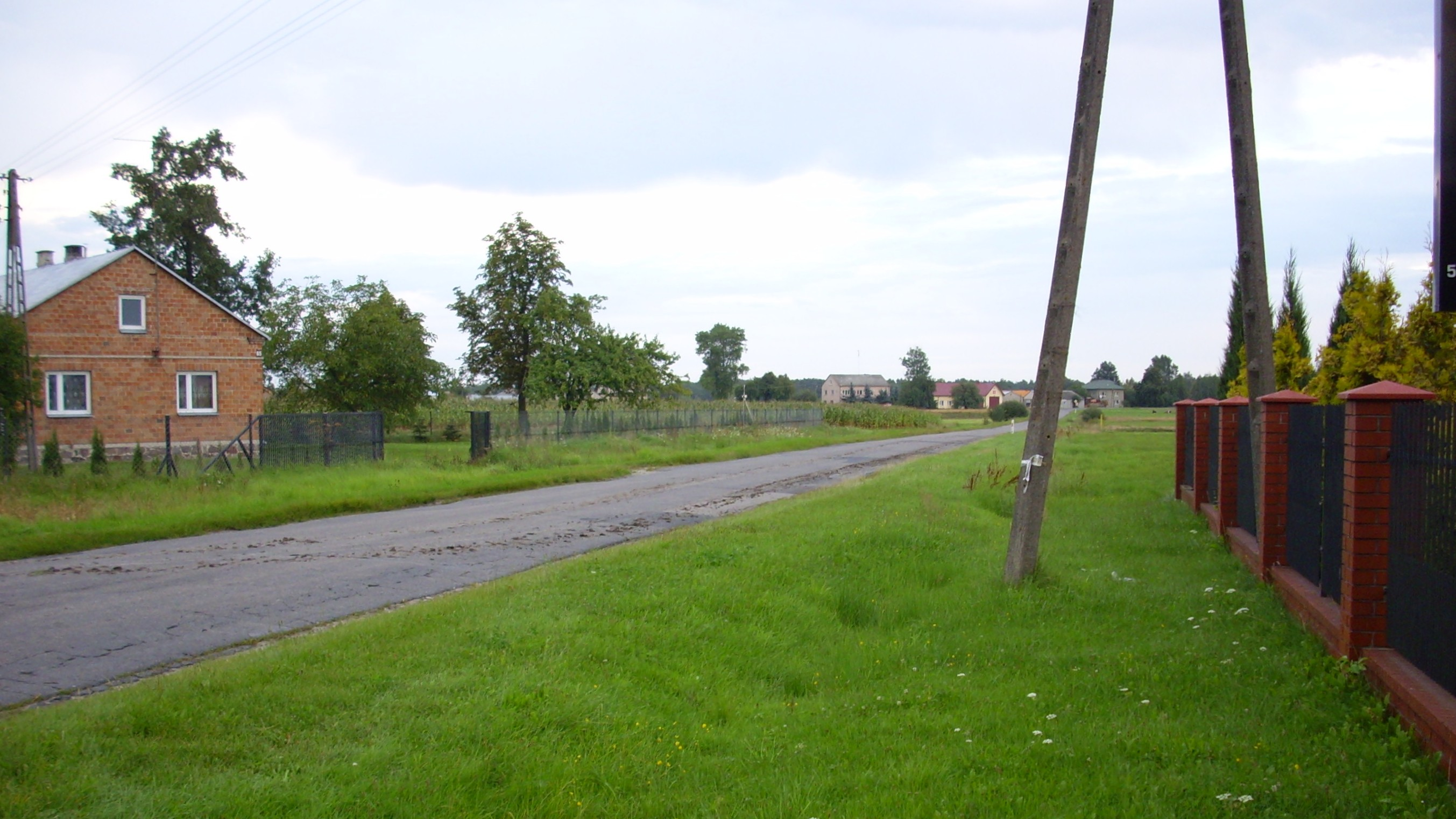

- Location within Poland
- Coordinates: 51°52′2″N 22°5′25″E
- Country: Poland
- Voivodeship: Lublin
- County: Łuków
- Gmina: Wola Mysłowska

Population
  - Total: 160
- Time zone: UTC+1 (CET)
  - Summer (DST): UTC+2 (CEST)
- Vehicle registration: LLU

Osiny [ɔˈɕinɨ] is a village in the administrative district of Gmina Wola Mysłowska, within Łuków County, Lublin Voivodeship, in eastern Poland.
