= Wandów, Lublin Voivodeship =

Wandów
- Village
- Location within Poland
- Coordinates: 51°51′N 22°3′E
- Country: Poland
- Voivodeship: Lublin
- County: Łuków
- Gmina: Wola Mysłowska
- Population: 240

Wandów [ˈvanduf] is a village in the administrative district of Gmina Wola Mysłowska, within Łuków County, Lublin Voivodeship, in eastern Poland.
