= Błażków =

- Village
- Location within Poland
- Coordinates: 51°53′N 22°1′E
- Country: Poland
- Voivodeship: Lublin
- County: Łuków
- Gmina: Wola Mysłowska

Błażków [ˈbwaʂkuf] is a village in the administrative district of Gmina Wola Mysłowska, within Łuków County, Lublin Voivodeship, in eastern Poland.
