= Lisikierz =

- Village
- Location within Poland
- Coordinates: 51°52′N 21°59′E
- Country: Poland
- Voivodeship: Lublin
- County: Łuków
- Gmina: Wola Mysłowska

Lisikierz [liˈɕikʲɛʂ] is a village in the administrative district of Gmina Wola Mysłowska, within Łuków County, Lublin Voivodeship, in eastern Poland.
