= Ksawerynówek =

- Village
- Location within Poland
- Coordinates: 51°50′50″N 22°0′46″E
- Country: Poland
- Voivodeship: Lublin
- County: Łuków
- Gmina: Wola Mysłowska
- Population: 190

Ksawerynówek [ksavɛrɨˈnuvɛk] is a village in the administrative district of Gmina Wola Mysłowska, within Łuków County, Lublin Voivodeship, in eastern Poland.
