= Kamień, Łuków County =

Kamień
- Village
- Location within Poland
- Coordinates: 51°51′N 22°2′E
- Country: Poland
- Voivodeship: Lublin
- County: Łuków
- Gmina: Wola Mysłowska

Kamień (Polish pronunciation: [ˈkamjɛj̃]) is a village in the administrative district of Gmina Wola Mysłowska, within Łuków County, Lublin Voivodeship, in eastern Poland.
