= Wilczyska, Lublin Voivodeship =

Wilczyska
- Village
- Location within Poland
- Coordinates: 51°50′54″N 21°54′9″E
- Country: Poland
- Voivodeship: Lublin
- County: Łuków
- Gmina: Wola Mysłowska
- Population: 370

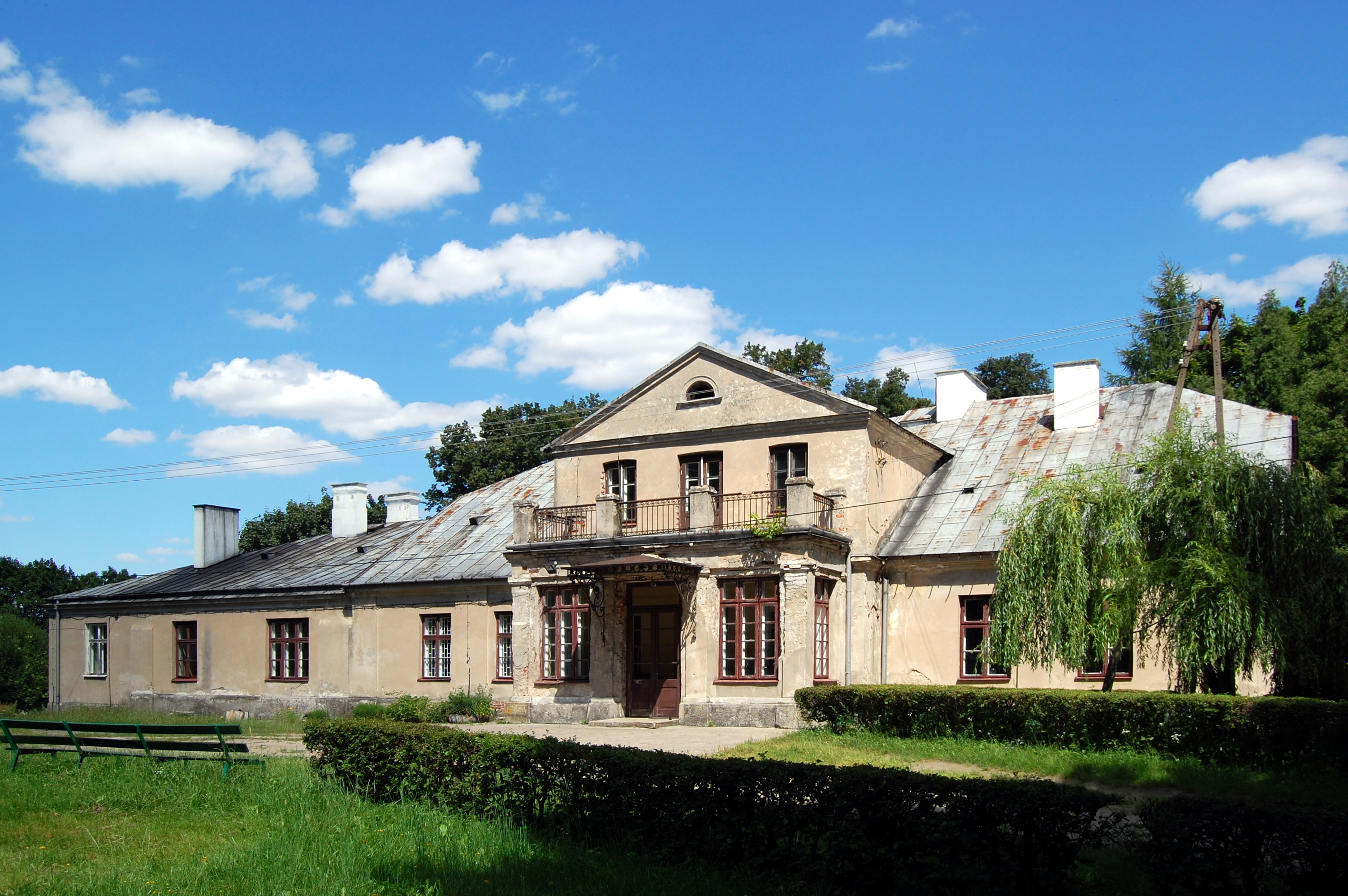
Wilczyska manor house

Wilczyska [vilˈt͡ʂɨska] is a village in the administrative district of Gmina Wola Mysłowska, within Łuków County, Lublin Voivodeship, in eastern Poland.
