= Powały, Lublin Voivodeship =

Powały
- Village
- Location within Poland
- Coordinates: 51°53′59″N 21°58′38″E
- Country: Poland
- Voivodeship: Lublin
- County: Łuków
- Gmina: Wola Mysłowska

Powały [pɔˈvawɨ] is a village in the administrative district of Gmina Wola Mysłowska, within Łuków County, Lublin Voivodeship, in eastern Poland.
