= Ciechomin, Lublin Voivodeship =

Ciechomin
- Village
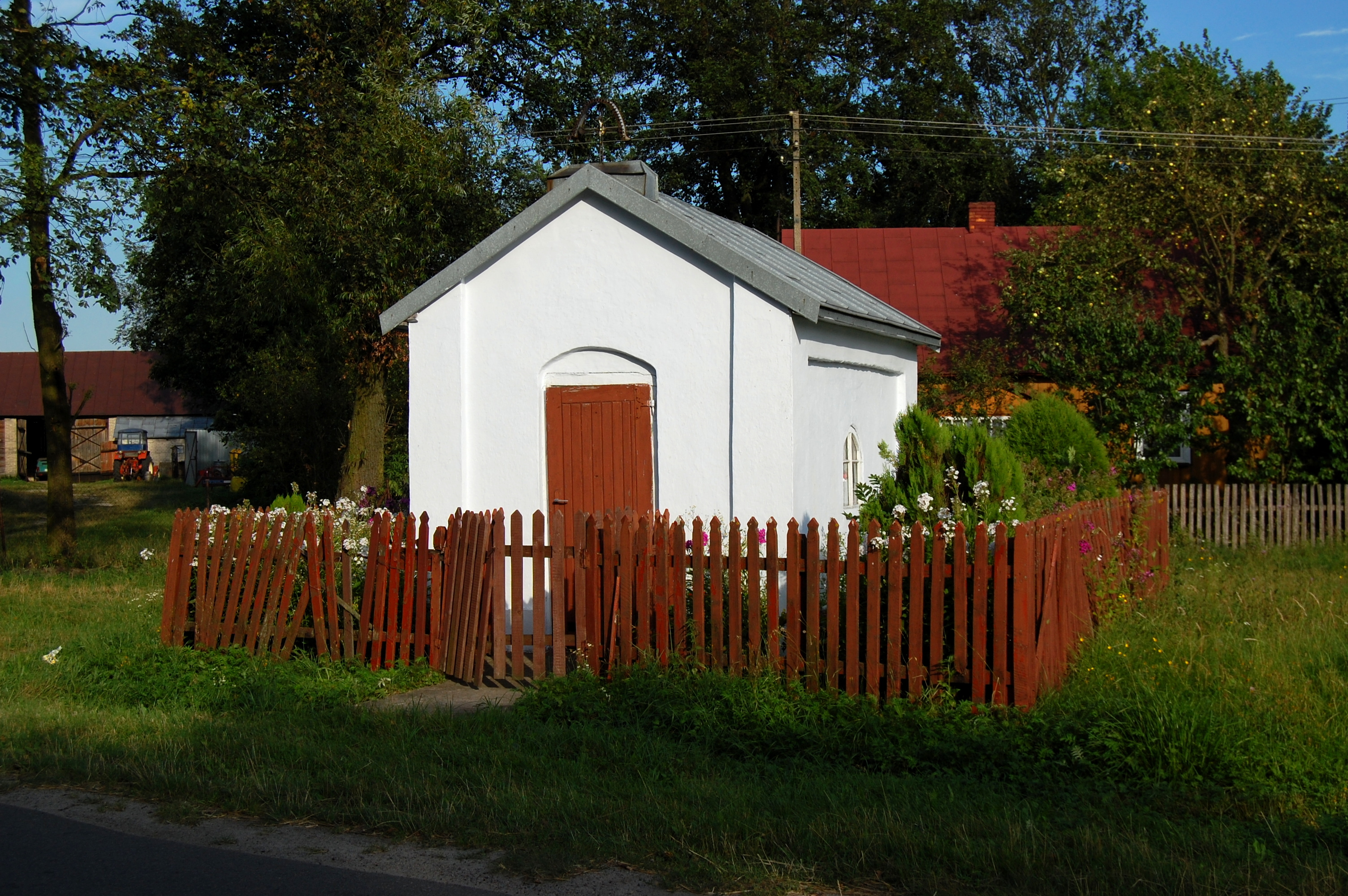
- Christian shrine in Ciechomin

- Location within Poland
- Coordinates: 51°52′45″N 21°57′5″E
- Country: Poland
- Voivodeship: Lublin
- County: Łuków
- Gmina: Wola Mysłowska
- Time zone: UTC+1 (CET)
  - Summer (DST): UTC+2 (CEST)

Ciechomin [t͡ɕɛˈxɔmin] is a village in the administrative district of Gmina Wola Mysłowska, within Łuków County, Lublin Voivodeship, in eastern Poland.

== History ==
Three Polish citizens were murdered by Nazi Germany in Ciechomin Podworski during World War II.
