= Jarczew =

- Village
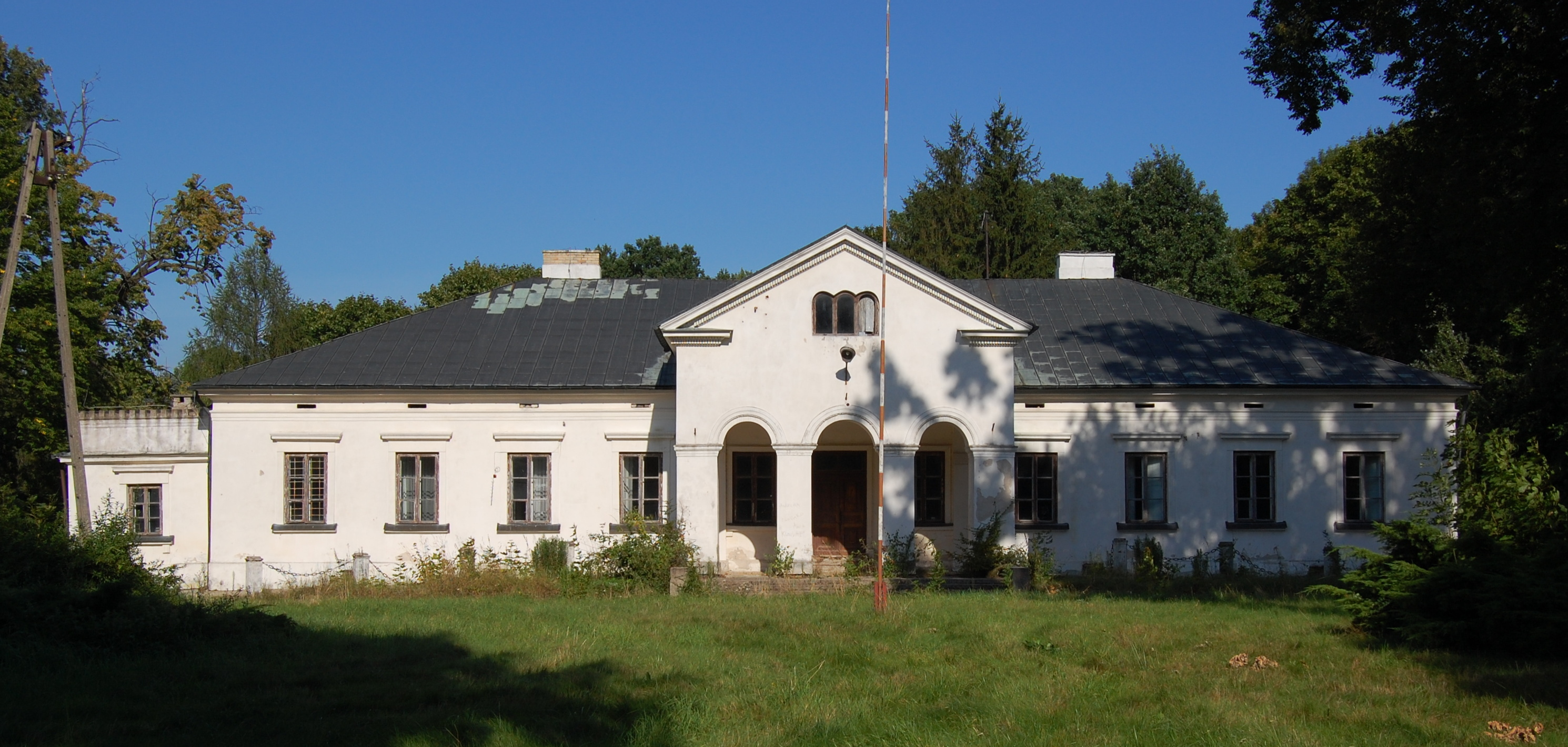
- Jarczew manor house

- Location within Poland
- Coordinates: 51°49′N 21°58′E
- Country: Poland
- Voivodeship: Lublin
- County: Łuków
- Gmina: Wola Mysłowska
- Time zone: UTC+1 (CET)
  - Summer (DST): UTC+2 (CEST)

Jarczew [ˈjart͡ʂɛf] is a village in the administrative district of Gmina Wola Mysłowska, within Łuków County, Lublin Voivodeship, in eastern Poland.

== History ==
Eight Polish citizens were murdered by Nazi Germany in the village during World War II.
