= Gmina Wola Mysłowska =

Gmina Wola Mysłowska Wola Mysłowska Commune
- Gmina
- Interactive map of Gmina Wola Mysłowska
- Coordinates (Wola Mysłowska): 51°51′N 21°57′E
- Country: Poland
- Voivodeship: Lublin
- County: Łuków
- Seat: Wola Mysłowska

Area
  - Total: 120.95 km^{2} (46.70 sq mi)

Population (2006)
  - Total: 5,244
  - Density: 43.36/km^{2} (112.3/sq mi)

Gmina Wola Mysłowska is a rural gmina (administrative district) in Łuków County, Lublin Voivodeship, in eastern Poland. Its seat is the village of Wola Mysłowska, which lies approximately 31 kilometres (19 mi) west of Łuków and 80 km (50 mi) north-west of the regional capital Lublin.

The gmina covers an area of 120.95 square kilometres (46.7 sq mi), and as of 2006 its total population is 5,244.

== Villages ==
Gmina Wola Mysłowska contains the villages and settlements of Baczków, Błażków, Ciechomin, Dwornia, Dychawica, Germanicha, Grudź, Jarczew, Kamień, Ksawerynówek, Lisikierz, Mysłów, Nowy Świat, Osiny, Powały, Stara Huta, Świder, Wandów, Wilczyska, Wola Mysłowska and Wólka Ciechomska.

== Neighbouring gminas ==
Gmina Wola Mysłowska is bordered by the gminas of Kłoczew, Krzywda, Miastków Kościelny, Stanin, Stoczek Łukowski and Żelechów.
