= Grudź =

- Village
- Location within Poland
- Coordinates: 51°53′N 22°3′E
- Country: Poland
- Voivodeship: Lublin
- County: Łuków
- Gmina: Wola Mysłowska

Grudź [ɡrut͡ɕ] is a village in the administrative district of Gmina Wola Mysłowska, within Łuków County, Lublin Voivodeship, in eastern Poland.
