= Dychawica, Lublin Voivodeship =

Dychawica
- Village
- Location within Poland
- Coordinates: 51°51′50.97″N 21°59′26.73″E
- Country: Poland
- Voivodeship: Lublin
- County: Łuków
- Gmina: Wola Mysłowska

Dychawica [dɨxaˈvit͡sa] is a village in the administrative district of Gmina Wola Mysłowska, within Łuków County, Lublin Voivodeship, in eastern Poland.
