= Germanicha =

- Village
- Location within Poland
- Coordinates: 51°49′59″N 22°01′25″E
- Country: Poland
- Voivodeship: Lublin
- County: Łuków
- Gmina: Wola Mysłowska

Germanicha [ɡɛrmaˈnixa] is a village in the administrative district of Gmina Wola Mysłowska, within Łuków County, Lublin Voivodeship, in eastern Poland. The estimated population of Germanicha is 1,250 people, according to recently collected population information on the region.
