= Bačkov (Havlíčkův Brod District) =

- Municipality
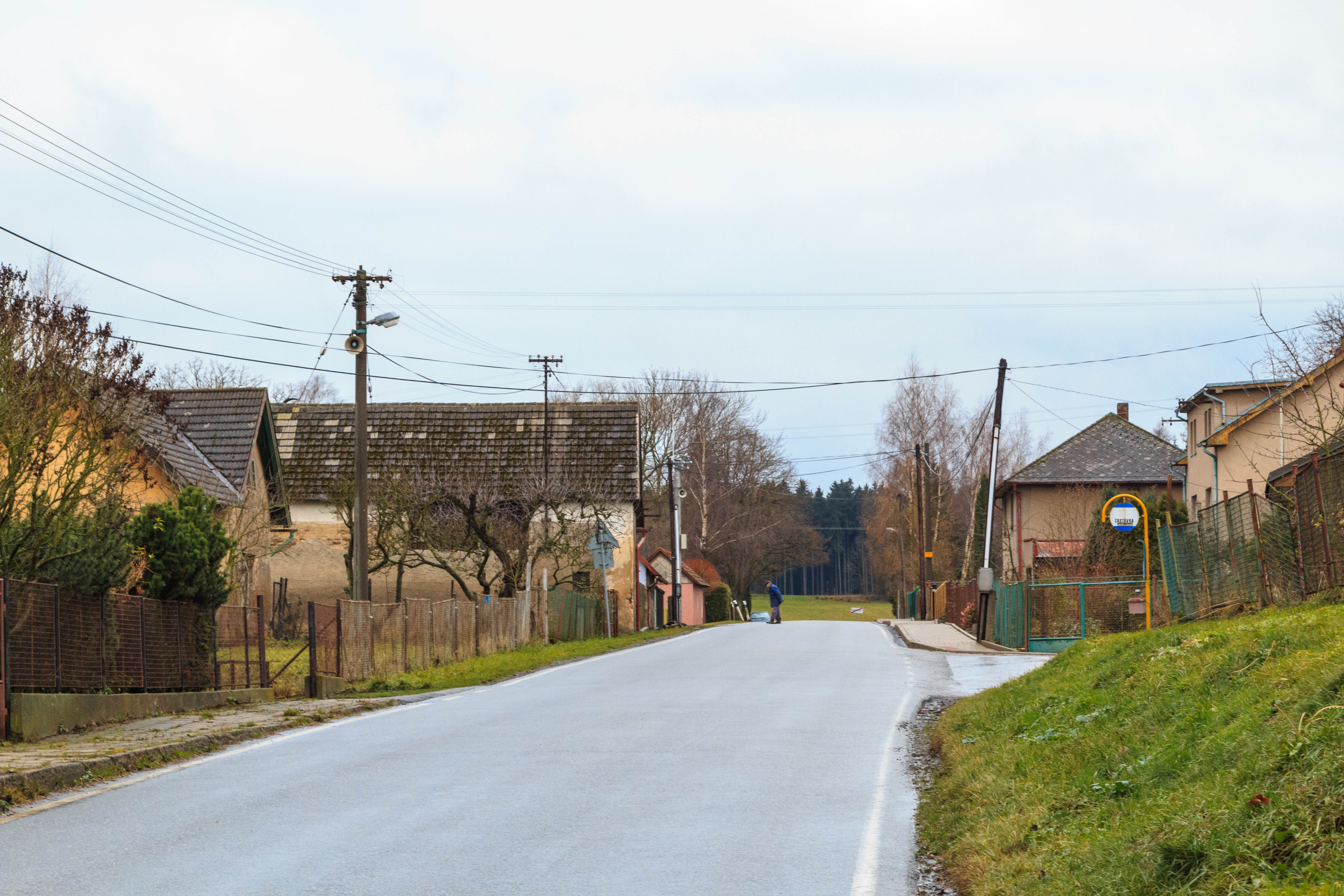
- Main street

- Flag Coat of arms

- Location in the Czech Republic
- Coordinates: 49°43′59″N 15°27′33″E
- Country: Czech Republic
- Region: Vysočina
- District: Havlíčkův Brod
- First mentioned: 1307

Area
  - Total: 3.14 km^{2} (1.21 sq mi)
- Elevation: 500 m (1,600 ft)

Population (2026-01-01)
  - Total: 113
  - Density: 36.0/km^{2} (93.2/sq mi)
- Time zone: UTC+1 (CET)
  - Summer (DST): UTC+2 (CEST)
- Postal code: 582 91
- Website: www.backov.cz

Bačkov (Czech pronunciation: [ˈbatʃkof]) is a municipality and village in Havlíčkův Brod District in the Vysočina Region of the Czech Republic. It has about 100 inhabitants.

== Etymology ==
The name is derived from the personal name Baček, meaning "the village of Baček's people".

== Geography ==
Bačkov is located about 16 kilometres (10 mi) north of Havlíčkův Brod and 37 km (23 mi) north of Jihlava. It lies in an agricultural landscape in the Upper Sázava Hills. The highest point is at 537 m (1,762 ft) above sea level. There are several small fishponds in the municipal territory.

== History ==
The first written mention of Bačkov is from 1307, when the village was acquired by the Benedictine monastery in Vilémov.

== Demographics ==
Historical population

Year	Pop.	±%
1869	235	—
1880	245	+4.3%
1890	271	+10.6%
1900	243	−10.3%
1910	277	+14.0%

Year	Pop.	±%
1921	272	−1.8%
1930	245	−9.9%
1950	171	−30.2%
1961	130	−24.0%
1970	141	+8.5%

Year	Pop.	±%
1980	176	+24.8%
1991	147	−16.5%
2001	149	+1.4%
2011	126	−15.4%
2021	121	−4.0%

Source: Censuses

== Transport ==
There are no railways or major roads passing through the municipality.

== Sights ==
There are no protected cultural monuments in the municipality. In the centre of Bačkov is a chapel.
