= Mysłów, Lublin Voivodeship =

Mysłów
- Village
- Location within Poland
- Coordinates: 51°50′25″N 21°58′31″E
- Country: Poland
- Voivodeship: Lublin
- County: Łuków
- Gmina: Wola Mysłowska
- Population: 470

Mysłów [ˈmɨswuf] is a village in the administrative district of Gmina Wola Mysłowska, within Łuków County, Lublin Voivodeship, in eastern Poland.
