= Stara Wieś, Mińsk County =

Stara Wieś
- Village
- Location within Poland
- Coordinates: 52°5′16″N 21°37′39″E
- Country: Poland
- Voivodeship: Masovian
- County: Mińsk
- Gmina: Siennica

Stara Wieś [ˈstara ˈvjɛɕ] is a former village in the administrative district of Gmina Siennica, within Mińsk County, Masovian Voivodeship, in east-central Poland. In 2009 it was incorporated into Siennica village.
