= Jędrzejów Stary =

- Village
- Location within Poland
- Coordinates: 52°11′49″N 21°43′56″E
- Country: Poland
- Voivodeship: Masovian
- County: Mińsk
- Gmina: Jakubów

Jędrzejów Stary (Polish pronunciation: [jɛnˈdʐɛjuf ˈstarɨ]) is a village in the administrative district of Gmina Jakubów, within Mińsk County, Masovian Voivodeship, in east-central Poland.
