= Chełst, Masovian Voivodeship =

Chełst
- Village
- Location within Poland
- Coordinates: 52°6′N 21°32′E
- Country: Poland
- Voivodeship: Masovian
- County: Mińsk
- Gmina: Siennica
- Population: 36

Chełst [xɛu̯st] is a village in the administrative district of Gmina Siennica, within Mińsk County, Masovian Voivodeship, in east-central Poland.
