= Kamionka, Gmina Jakubów =

Kamionka
- Village
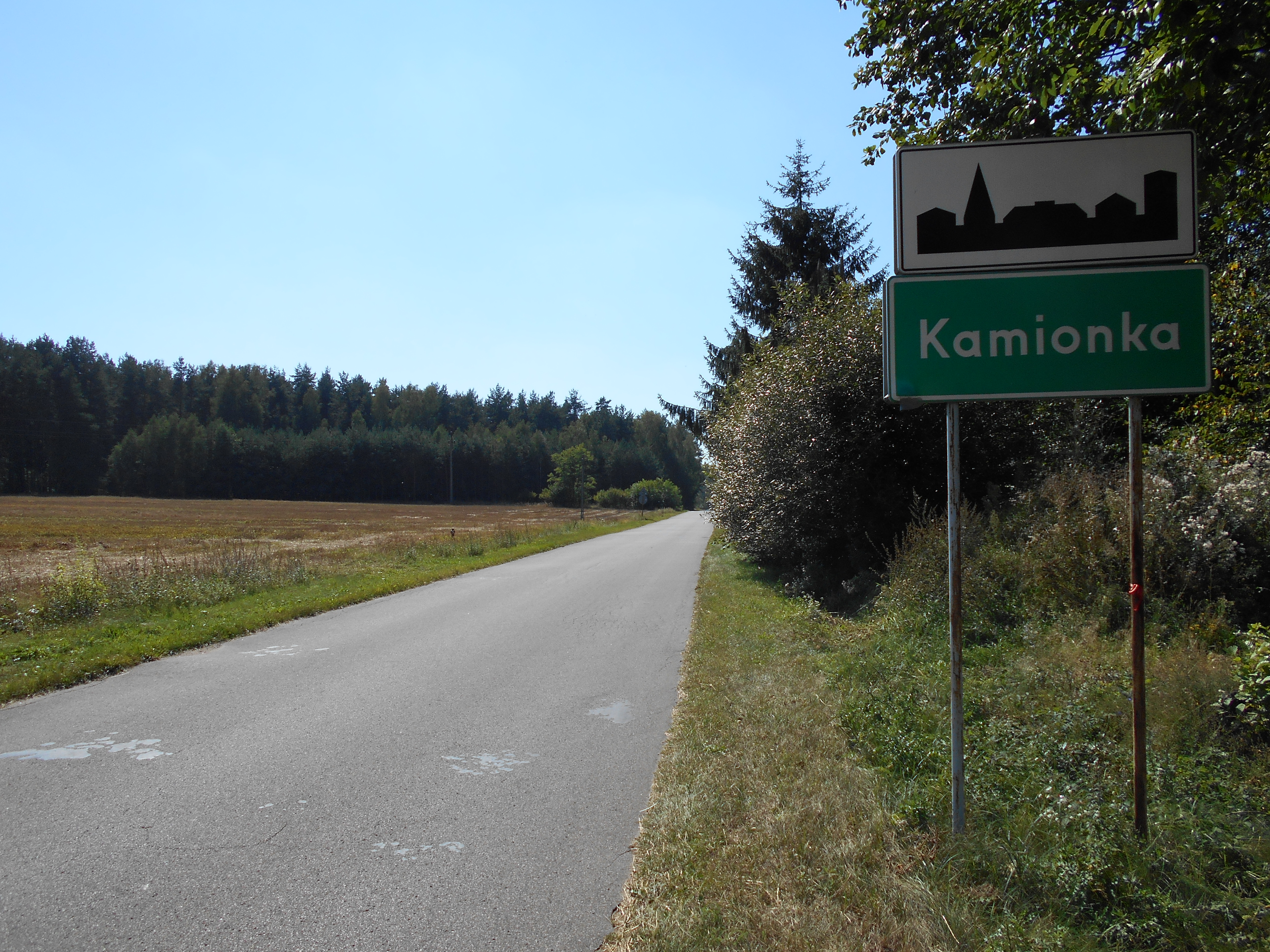
- Road sign in Kamionka

- Location within Poland
- Coordinates: 52°17′07″N 21°43′28″E
- Country: Poland
- Voivodeship: Masovian
- County: Mińsk
- Gmina: Jakubów
- Population: 118

Kamionka [kaˈmjɔnka] is a village in the administrative district of Gmina Jakubów, within Mińsk County, Masovian Voivodeship, in east-central Poland.
