= NART =

Nart or NART may refer to:

- National Adult Reading Test
- North American Racing Team
- Nart sagas, Caucasian myths

== Places ==
- Nart, Masovian Voivodeship, east-central Poland
- Nart, Podlaskie Voivodeship, north-east Poland

== See also ==
- NARTH
- Naruto
