= Łękawica, Mińsk County =

Łękawica
- Village
- Location within Poland
- Coordinates: 52°6′45″N 21°39′11″E
- Country: Poland
- Voivodeship: Masovian
- County: Mińsk
- Gmina: Siennica
- Population: 170

Łękawica [wɛnkaˈvit͡sa] is a village in the administrative district of Gmina Siennica, within Mińsk County, Masovian Voivodeship, in east-central Poland.
