= Ptaki, Masovian Voivodeship =

Ptaki
- Village
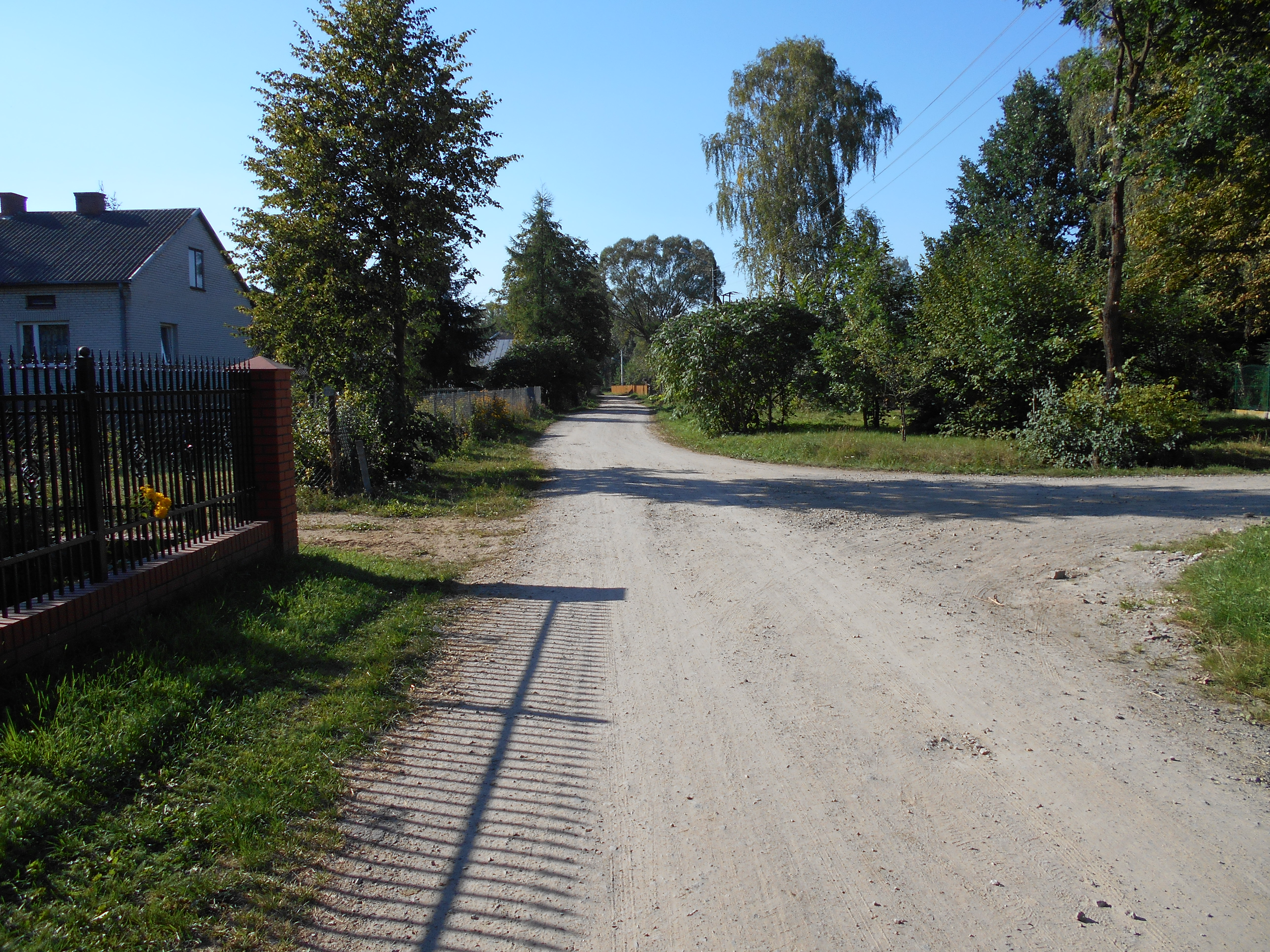
- View of Ptaki Village

- Location within Poland
- Coordinates: 52°02′42″N 21°38′57″E
- Country: Poland
- Voivodeship: Masovian
- County: Mińsk
- Gmina: Siennica
- Population: 42

Ptaki [ˈptaki] is a village in the administrative district of Gmina Siennica, within Mińsk County, Masovian Voivodeship, in east-central Poland.
