= Boża Wola, Mińsk County =

Boża Wola
- Village
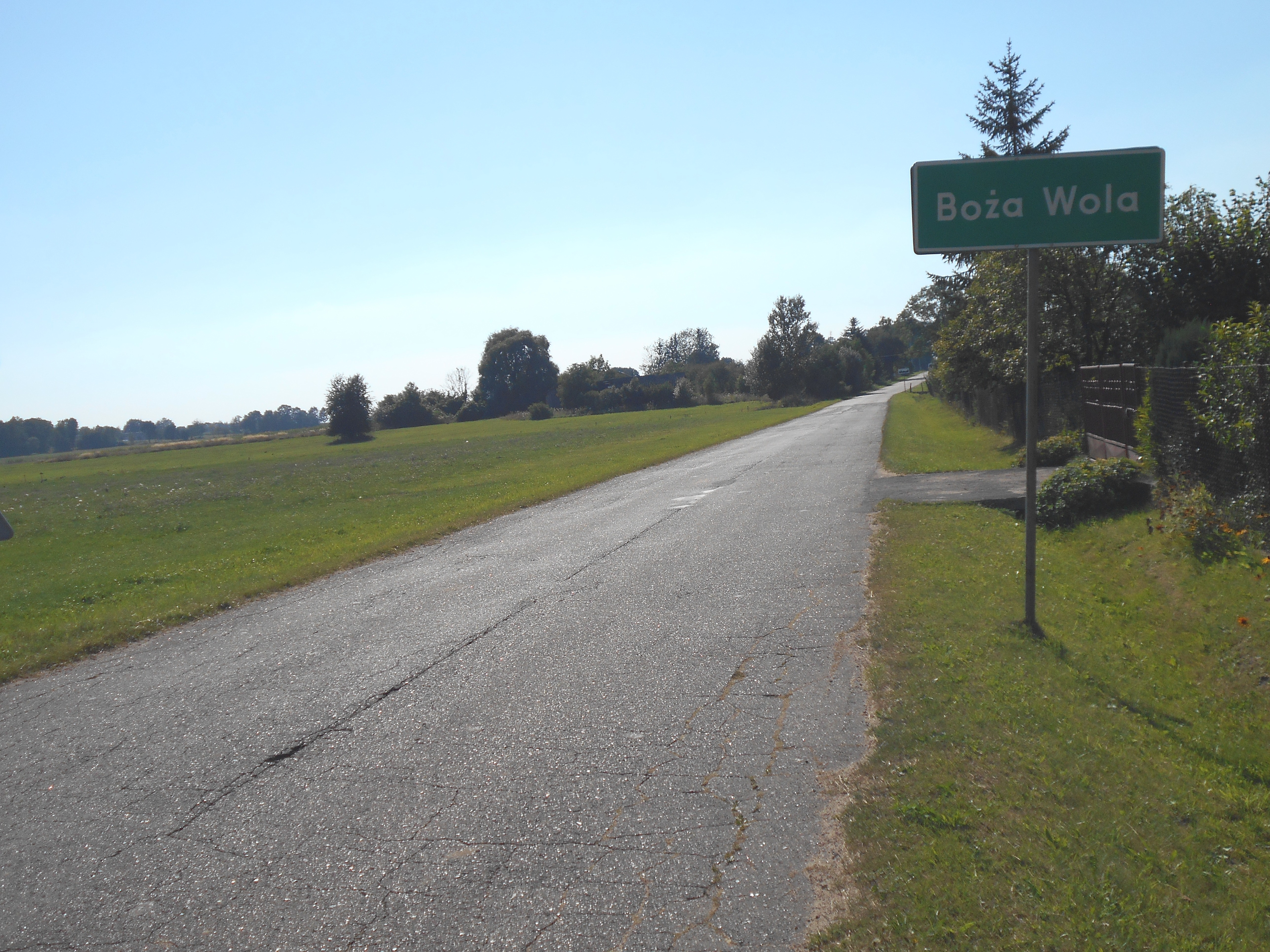

- Location within Poland
- Coordinates: 52°6′57″N 21°40′25″E
- Country: Poland
- Voivodeship: Masovian
- County: Mińsk
- Gmina: Siennica
- Population: 51

Boża Wola [ˈbɔʐa ˈvɔla] is a village in the administrative district of Gmina Siennica, within Mińsk County, Masovian Voivodeship, in east-central Poland.

Its main attraction is "Dworek", a mansion from 19th century. From 1992 it is used by the Prelature of Opus Dei.

As per census 2011, the village has a population of 137.
