= Wojciechówka, Mińsk County =

Wojciechówka
- Village
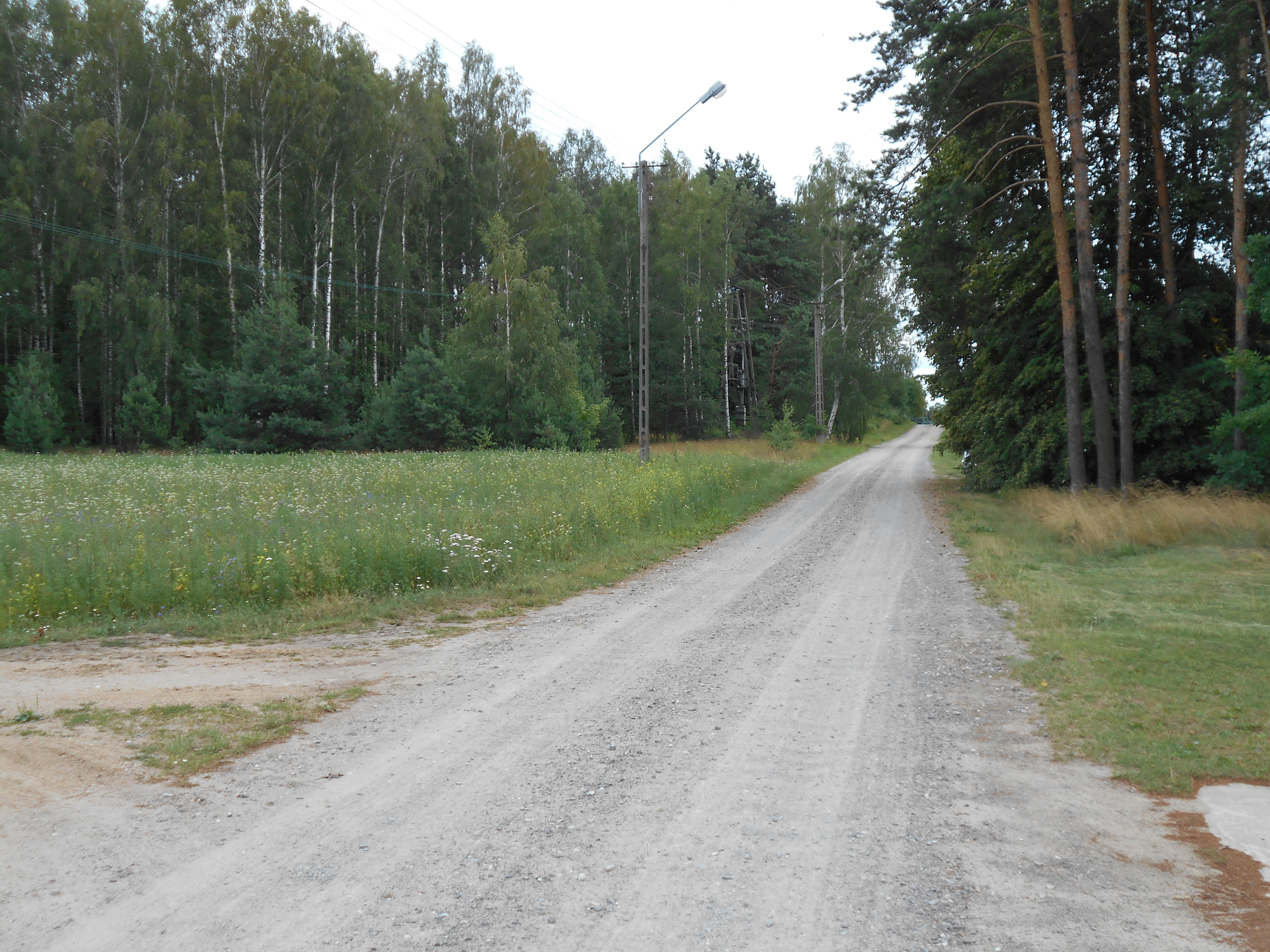

- Location within Poland
- Coordinates: 52°06′55″N 21°36′57″E
- Country: Poland
- Voivodeship: Masovian
- County: Mińsk
- Gmina: Siennica
- Population: 96

Wojciechówka (Polish pronunciation: [vɔjt͡ɕɛˈxufka]) is a village in the administrative district of Gmina Siennica, within Mińsk County, Masovian Voivodeship, in east-central Poland.
