= Kulki, Masovian Voivodeship =

Kulki
- Village
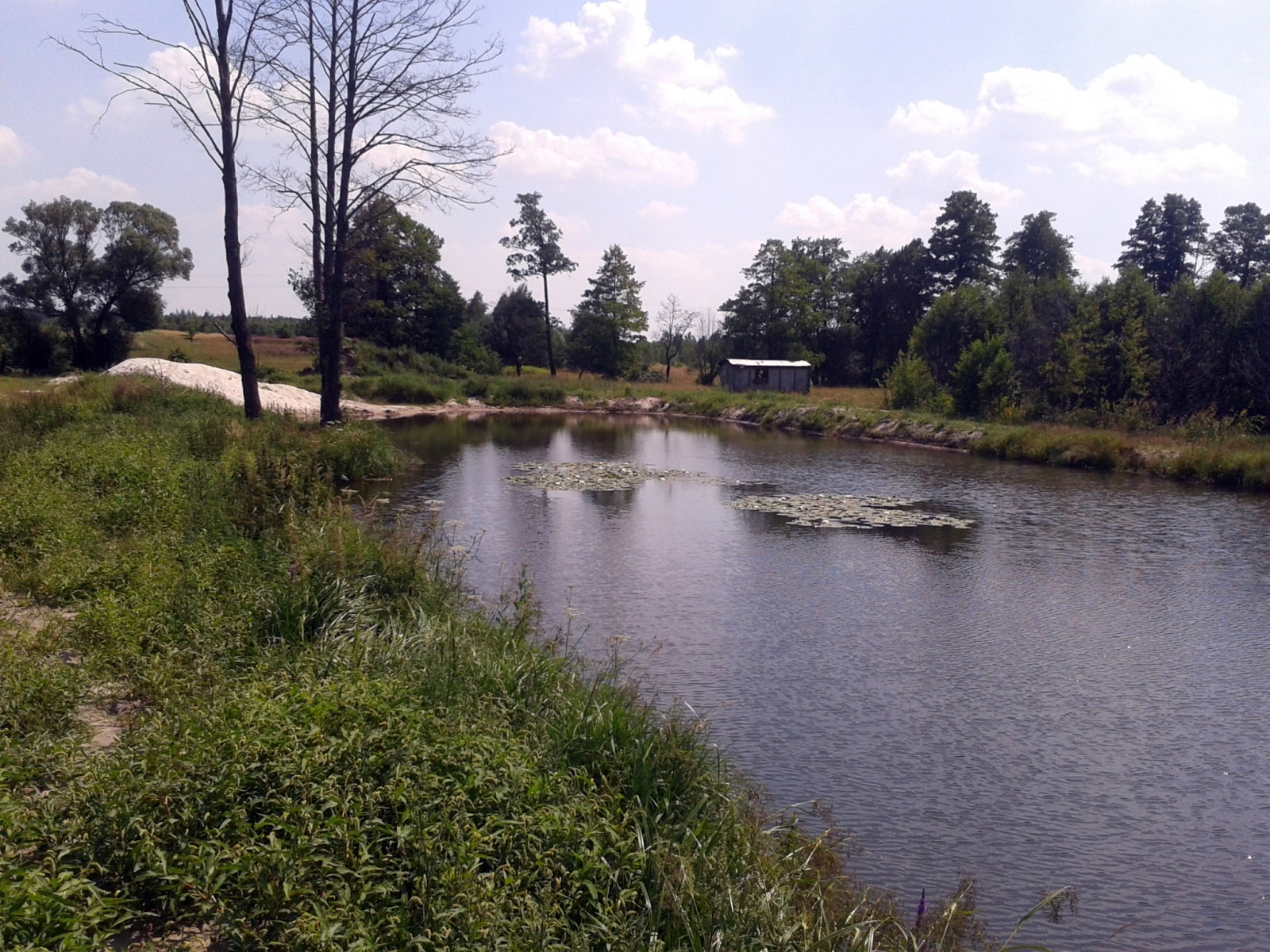

- Location within Poland
- Coordinates: 52°3′1″N 21°39′23″E
- Country: Poland
- Voivodeship: Masovian
- County: Mińsk
- Gmina: Siennica
- Population: 70

Kulki [ˈkulki] is a village in the administrative district of Gmina Siennica, within Mińsk County, Masovian Voivodeship, in east-central Poland.
