= Ludwinów, Mińsk County =

Ludwinów
- Village
- Location within Poland
- Coordinates: 52°16′N 21°37′E
- Country: Poland
- Voivodeship: Masovian
- County: Mińsk
- Gmina: Jakubów
- Population: 164

Ludwinów [ludˈvinuf] is a village in the administrative district of Gmina Jakubów, within Mińsk County, Masovian Voivodeship, in east-central Poland.
