= Lasomin =

- Village
- Location within Poland
- Coordinates: 52°03′55″N 21°35′19″E
- Country: Poland
- Voivodeship: Masovian
- County: Mińsk
- Gmina: Siennica
- Population: 99

Lasomin [laˈsɔmin] is a village in the administrative district of Gmina Siennica, within Mińsk County, Masovian Voivodeship, in east-central Poland.
