= Leontyna, Masovian Voivodeship =

Leontyna
- Village
- Location within Poland
- Coordinates: 52°13′40″N 21°36′56″E
- Country: Poland
- Voivodeship: Masovian
- County: Mińsk
- Gmina: Jakubów

Leontyna [lɛɔnˈtɨna] is a village in the administrative district of Gmina Jakubów, within Mińsk County, Masovian Voivodeship, in east-central Poland.
