= Majdan, Mińsk County =

Majdan
- Village
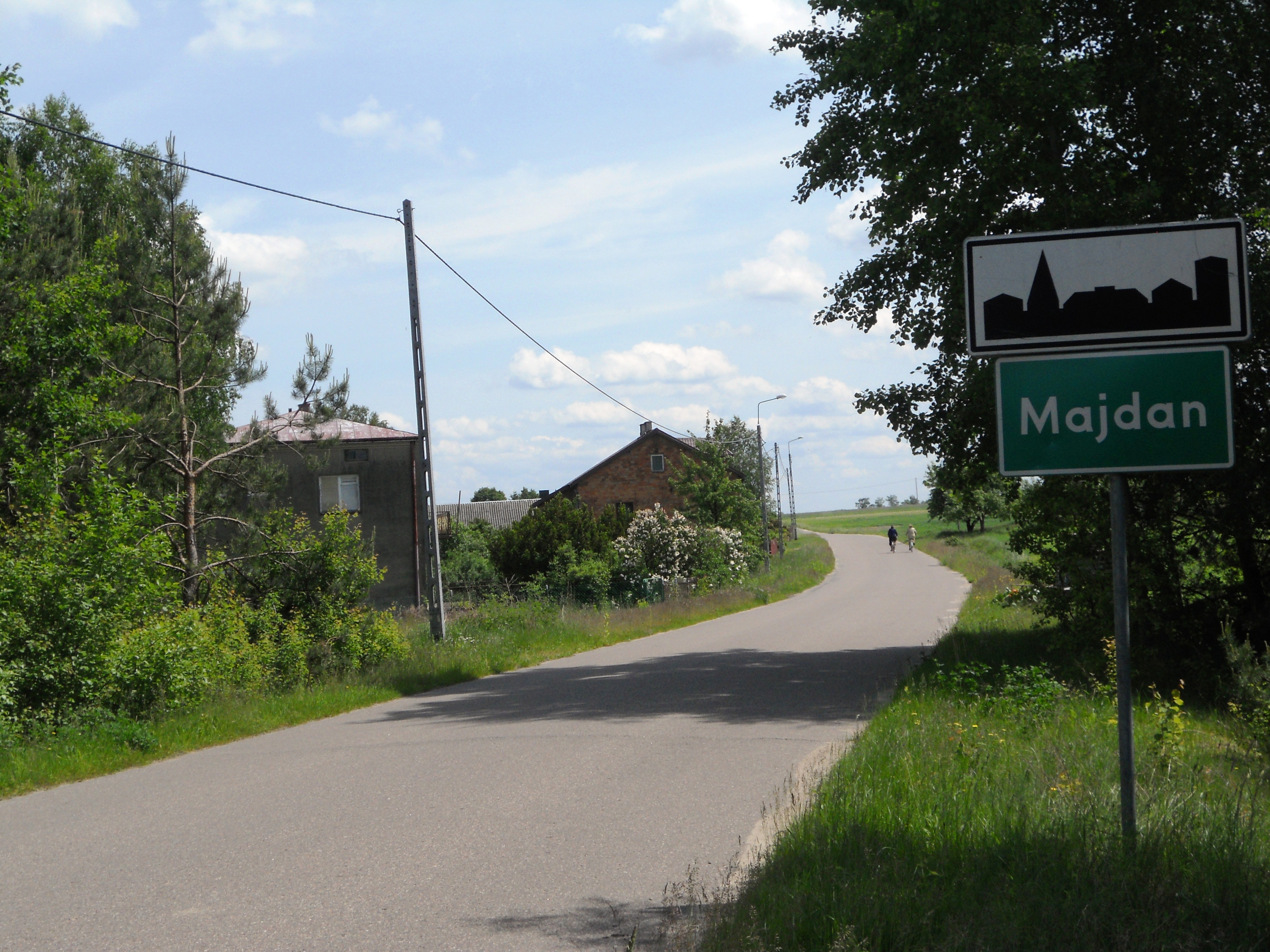
- Street of Majdan, Gmina Siennica, Mińsk County

- Location within Poland
- Coordinates: 52°02′34″N 21°35′26″E
- Country: Poland
- Voivodeship: Masovian
- County: Mińsk
- Gmina: Siennica

Majdan (Polish pronunciation: [ˈmajdan]) is a village in the administrative district of Gmina Siennica, within Mińsk County, Masovian Voivodeship, in east-central Poland.
