= Świętochy =

- Village
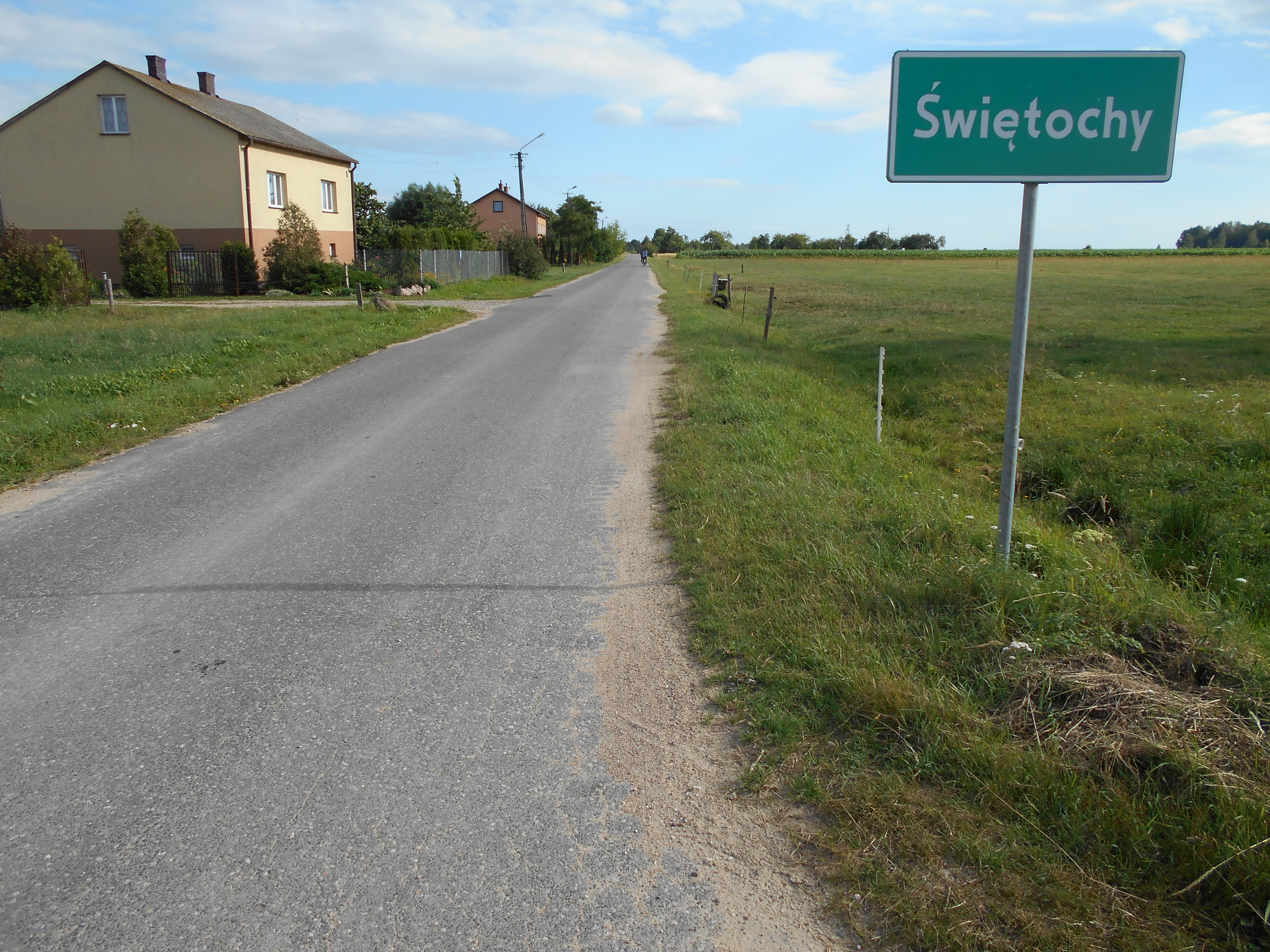
- Road sign in Świętochy

- Location within Poland
- Coordinates: 52°04′42″N 21°40′07″E
- Country: Poland
- Voivodeship: Masovian
- County: Mińsk
- Gmina: Siennica
- Population (approx.): 80

Świętochy (Polish pronunciation: [ɕfjɛnˈtɔxɨ]) is a village in the administrative district of Gmina Siennica, within Mińsk County, Masovian Voivodeship, in east-central Poland.
