= Anielinek =

- Village
- Location within Poland
- Coordinates: 52°13′26″N 21°38′01″E
- Country: Poland
- Voivodeship: Masovian
- County: Mińsk
- Gmina: Jakubów
- Population: 251

Anielinek [aɲɛˈlinɛk] is a village in the administrative district of Gmina Jakubów, within Mińsk County, Masovian Voivodeship, in east-central Poland.
