= Strugi Krzywickie =

- Village
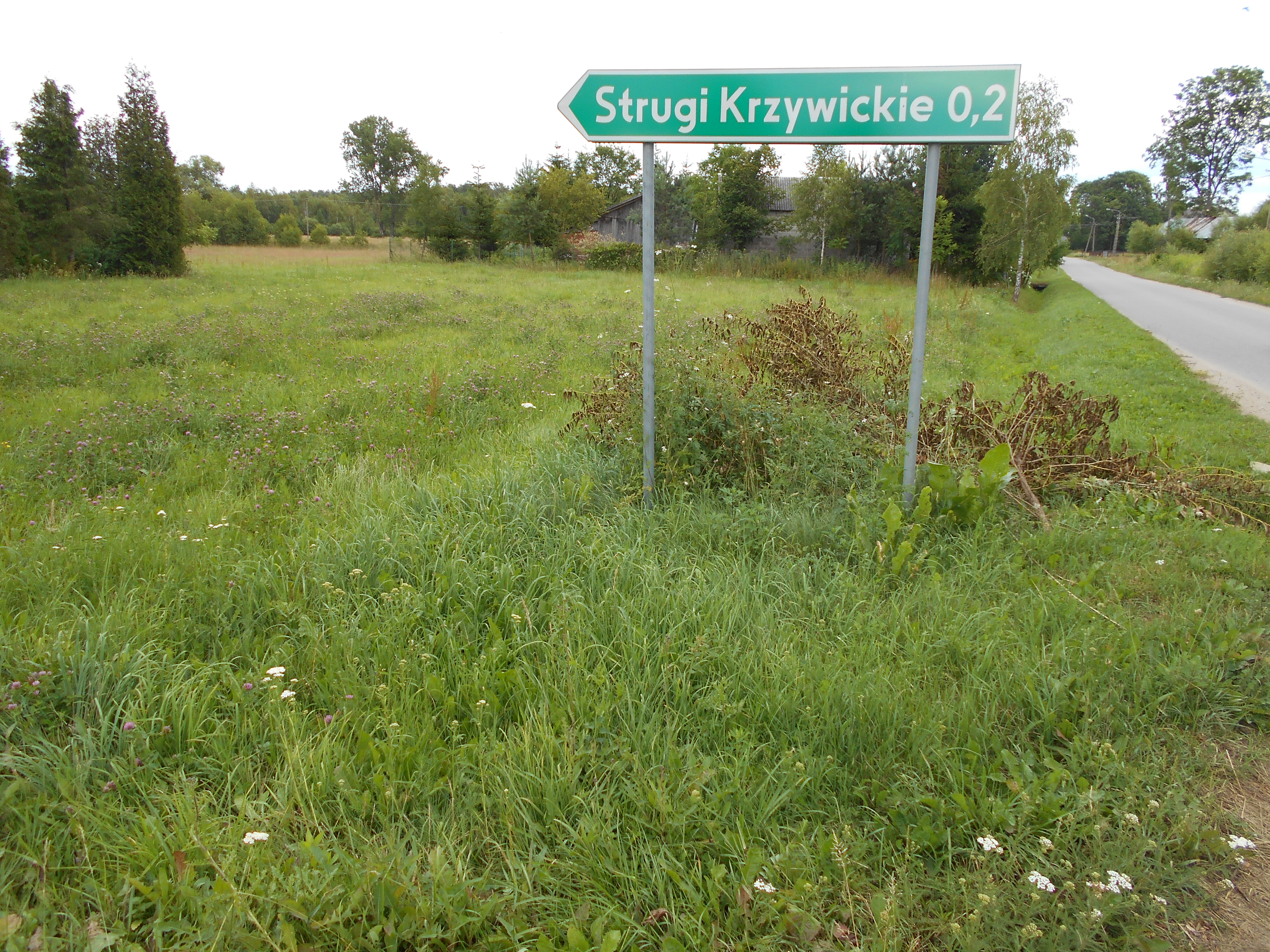
- Road sign in Strugi Krzywickie

- Location within Poland
- Coordinates: 52°07′34″N 21°38′01″E
- Country: Poland
- Voivodeship: Masovian
- County: Mińsk
- Gmina: Siennica
- Population: 68

Strugi Krzywickie [ˈstruɡi kʂɨˈvit͡skʲɛ] is a village in the administrative district of Gmina Siennica, within Mińsk County, Masovian Voivodeship, in east-central Poland.
