= Łaziska, Mińsk County =

Łaziska
- Village
- Location within Poland
- Coordinates: 52°14′42″N 21°39′53″E
- Country: Poland
- Voivodeship: Masovian
- County: Mińsk
- Gmina: Jakubów
- Population: 230

Łaziska [waˈʑiska] is a village in the administrative district of Gmina Jakubów, within Mińsk County, Masovian Voivodeship, in east-central Poland.
