= Gruening =

Gruening is a surname. Notable people with the surname include:

- Clark Gruening (1943–2025), American attorney and politician
- Dorothy Smith Gruening (1888–1979), American social activist and pacifist, wife of Ernest
- Ernest Gruening (1887–1974), grandfather of Clark, American journalist and politician, governor of Alaska Territory 1939–1953, U.S. Senator from Alaska 1959–1969
- Martha Gruening (1889–1937), American journalist, poet, suffragette, and civil rights activist

== See also ==
- Ferdynand Grüning (c. 1885–1939 or later), Polish serial killer and child rapist
- Ilka Grüning (1876–1964), Austrian-Hungarian actress
