= Nowe Zalesie =

Nowe Zalesie may refer to the following places:

- Nowe Zalesie, Masovian Voivodeship (east-central Poland)
- Nowe Zalesie, Wysokie Mazowieckie County in Podlaskie Voivodeship (north-east Poland)
- Nowe Zalesie, Zambrów County in Podlaskie Voivodeship (north-east Poland)
