= Dąbrowa, Gmina Siennica =

Dąbrowa
- Village
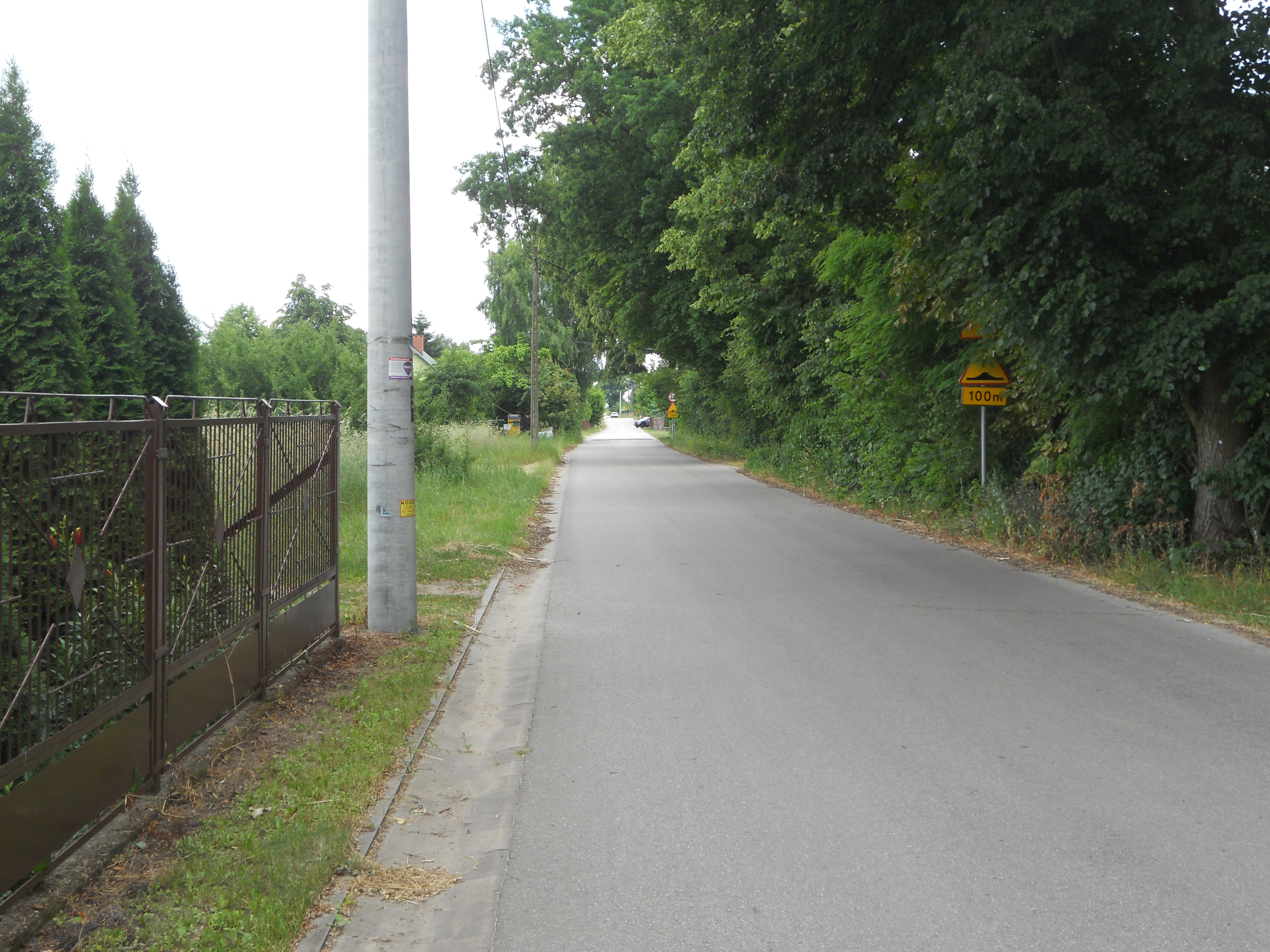
- Road in Dąbrowa Gmina Siennica

- Location within Poland
- Coordinates: 52°06′14″N 21°34′08″E
- Country: Poland
- Voivodeship: Masovian
- County: Mińsk
- Gmina: Siennica
- Population: 49

Dąbrowa [dɔmˈbrɔva] is a village in the administrative district of Gmina Siennica, within Mińsk County, Masovian Voivodeship, in east-central Poland.
