= Pogorzel, Mińsk County =

Pogorzel
- Village
- Location within Poland
- Coordinates: 52°6′N 21°35′E
- Country: Poland
- Voivodeship: Masovian
- County: Mińsk
- Gmina: Siennica
- Population: 578
- Website: http://www.pogorzel.republika.pl

Pogorzel [pɔˈɡɔʐɛl] is a village in the administrative district of Gmina Siennica, within Mińsk County, Masovian Voivodeship, in east-central Poland.
