= Góry, Mińsk County =

Góry
- Village
- Location within Poland
- Coordinates: 52°13′35″N 21°43′24″E
- Country: Poland
- Voivodeship: Masovian
- County: Mińsk
- Gmina: Jakubów

Góry [ˈɡurɨ] is a village in the administrative district of Gmina Jakubów, within Mińsk County, Masovian Voivodeship, in east-central Poland.
