= Zalesie, Gmina Siennica =

Zalesie
- Village
- Location within Poland
- Coordinates: 52°5′23″N 21°34′46″E
- Country: Poland
- Voivodeship: Masovian
- County: Mińsk
- Gmina: Siennica
- Population: 164

Zalesie [zaˈlɛɕɛ] is a village in the administrative district of Gmina Siennica, within Mińsk County, Masovian Voivodeship, in east-central Poland.
