= Aleksandrów, Mińsk County =

Aleksandrów
- Village
- Location within Poland
- Coordinates: 52°12′52″N 21°44′13″E
- Country: Poland
- Voivodeship: Masovian
- County: Mińsk
- Gmina: Jakubów

Aleksandrów [alɛkˈsandruf] is a village in the administrative district of Gmina Jakubów, within Mińsk County, Masovian Voivodeship, in east-central Poland.
