= Budy Łękawickie =

- Village
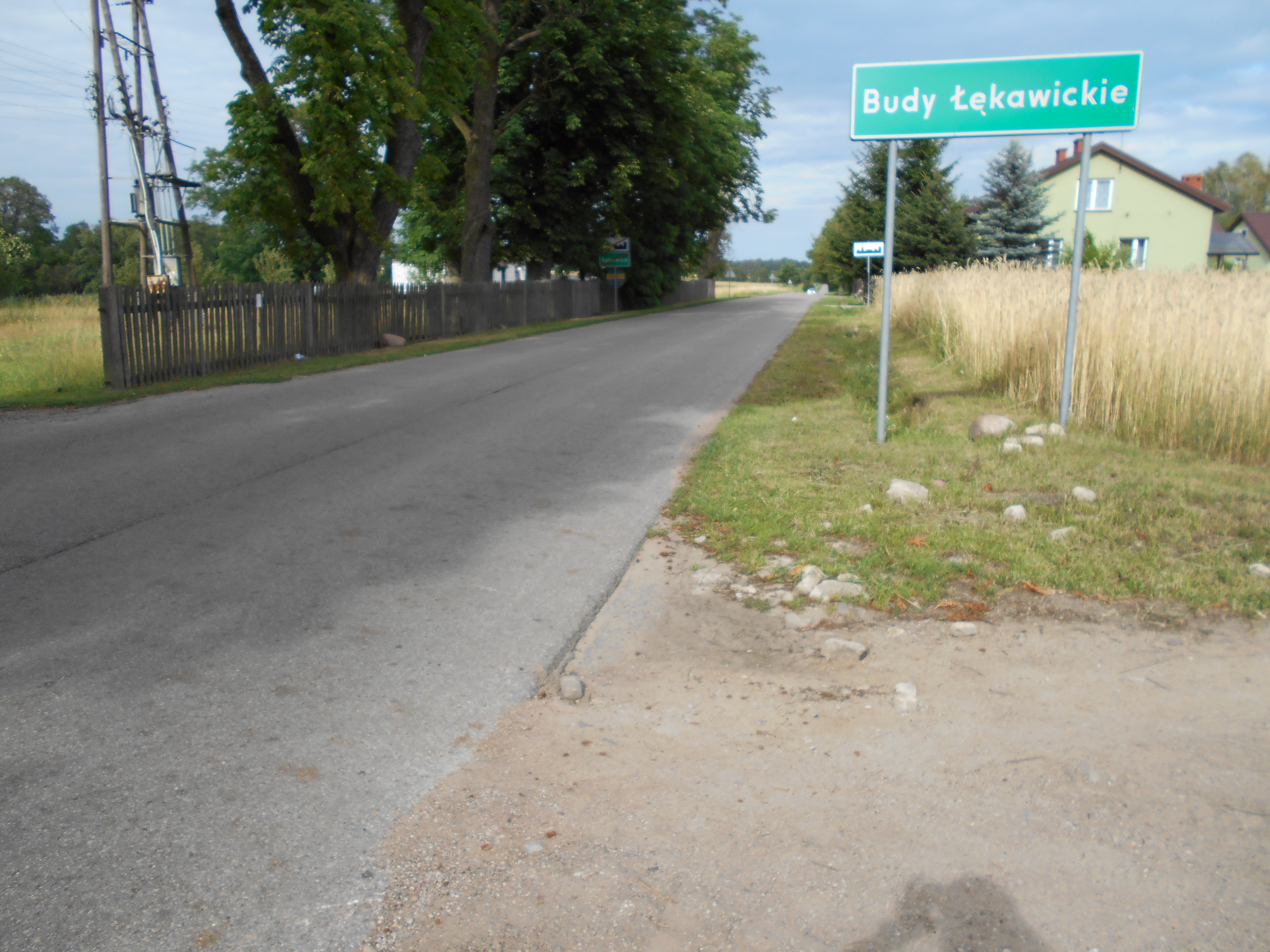
- Road sign leading to the village

- Location within Poland
- Coordinates: 52°7′6″N 21°39′46″E
- Country: Poland
- Voivodeship: Masovian
- County: Mińsk
- Gmina: Siennica
- Population: 78

Budy Łękawickie [ˈbudɨ wɛnkaˈvit͡skʲɛ] is a village in the administrative district of Gmina Siennica, within Mińsk County, Masovian Voivodeship, in east-central Poland.
