= Budy Kumińskie =

- Village
- Location within Poland
- Coordinates: 52°14′N 21°44′E
- Country: Poland
- Voivodeship: Masovian
- County: Mińsk
- Gmina: Jakubów
- Population: 66

Budy Kumińskie [ˈbudɨ kuˈmiɲskʲɛ] is a village in the administrative district of Gmina Jakubów, within Mińsk County, Masovian Voivodeship, in east-central Poland.
