= Nowa Pogorzel =

- Village
- Location within Poland
- Coordinates: 52°07′11″N 21°34′57″E
- Country: Poland
- Voivodeship: Masovian
- County: Mińsk
- Gmina: Siennica
- Population: 225

Nowa Pogorzel [ˈnɔva pɔˈɡɔʐɛl] is a village in the administrative district of Gmina Siennica, within Mińsk County, Masovian Voivodeship, in east-central Poland.

The village had a population of 225 in 2008.
