= Nowy Zglechów =

- Village
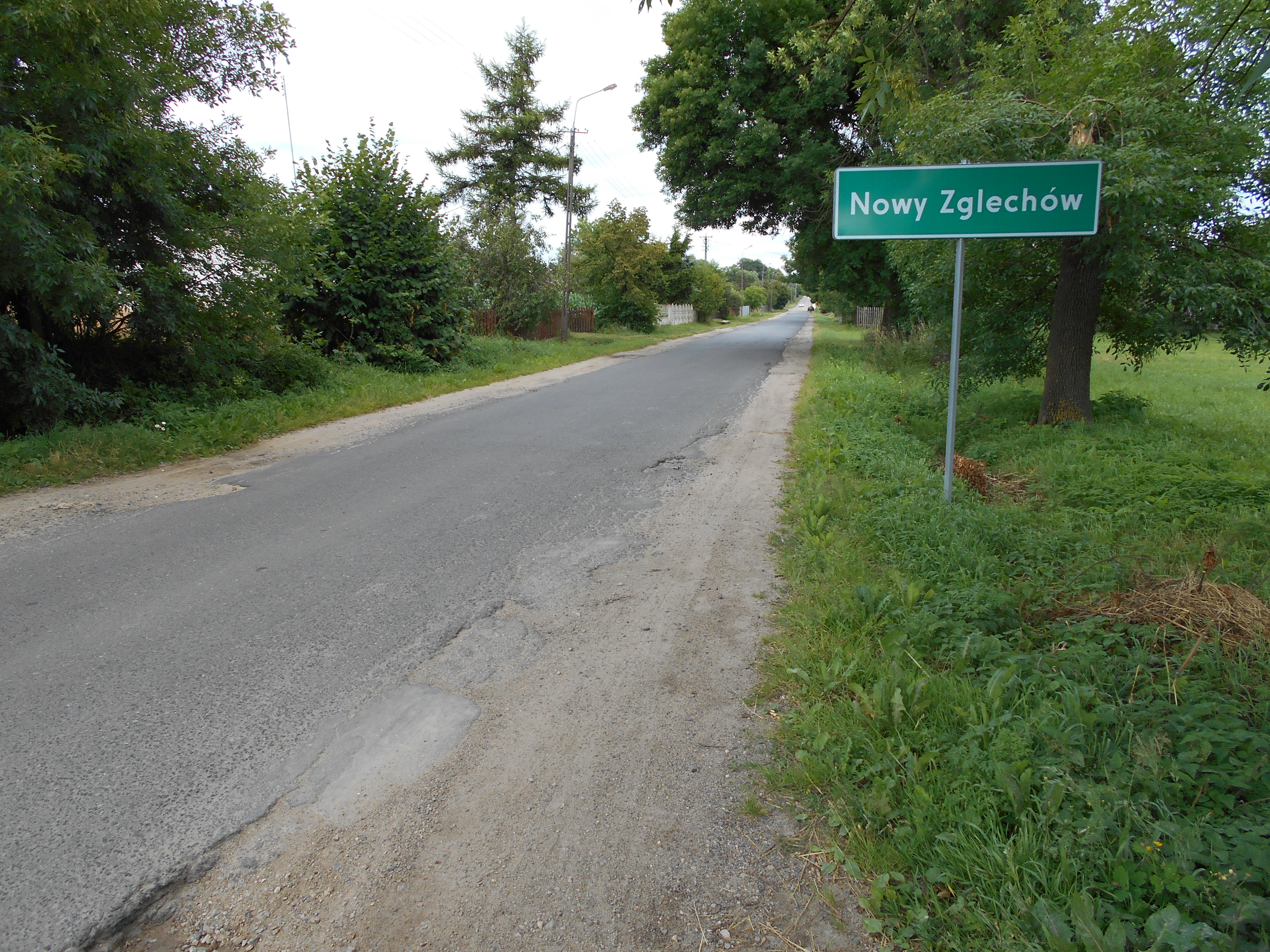
- Road sign in Nowy Zglechów

- Location within Poland
- Coordinates: 52°05′48″N 21°40′16″E
- Country: Poland
- Voivodeship: Masovian
- County: Mińsk
- Gmina: Siennica
- Population: 214

Nowy Zglechów [ˈnɔvɨ ˈzɡlɛxuf] is a village in the administrative district of Gmina Siennica, within Mińsk County, Masovian Voivodeship, in east-central Poland.
