= Antonin, Masovian Voivodeship =

Antonin
- Village
- Location within Poland
- Coordinates: 52°12′34″N 21°42′2″E
- Country: Poland
- Voivodeship: Masovian
- County: Mińsk
- Gmina: Jakubów
- Population: 90

Antonin (Polish pronunciation: [anˈtɔɲin]) is a village in the administrative district of Gmina Jakubów, within Mińsk County, Masovian Voivodeship, in east-central Poland.
