= Grzebowilk, Gmina Siennica =

Grzebowilk
- Village
- Location within Poland
- Coordinates: 52°6′56″N 21°32′29″E
- Country: Poland
- Voivodeship: Masovian
- County: Mińsk
- Gmina: Siennica
- Population (approx.): 390

Grzebowilk [ɡʐɛˈbɔvilk] is a village in the administrative district of Gmina Siennica, within Mińsk County, Masovian Voivodeship, in east-central Poland.
