= Rządza, Gmina Jakubów =

Rządza
- Village
- Location within Poland
- Coordinates: 52°14′46″N 21°42′02″E
- Country: Poland
- Voivodeship: Masovian
- County: Mińsk
- Gmina: Jakubów
- Population: 294

Rządza [ˈʐɔnd͡za] is a village in the administrative district of Gmina Jakubów, within Mińsk County, Masovian Voivodeship, in east-central Poland.
