= Nowy Starogród =

- Village
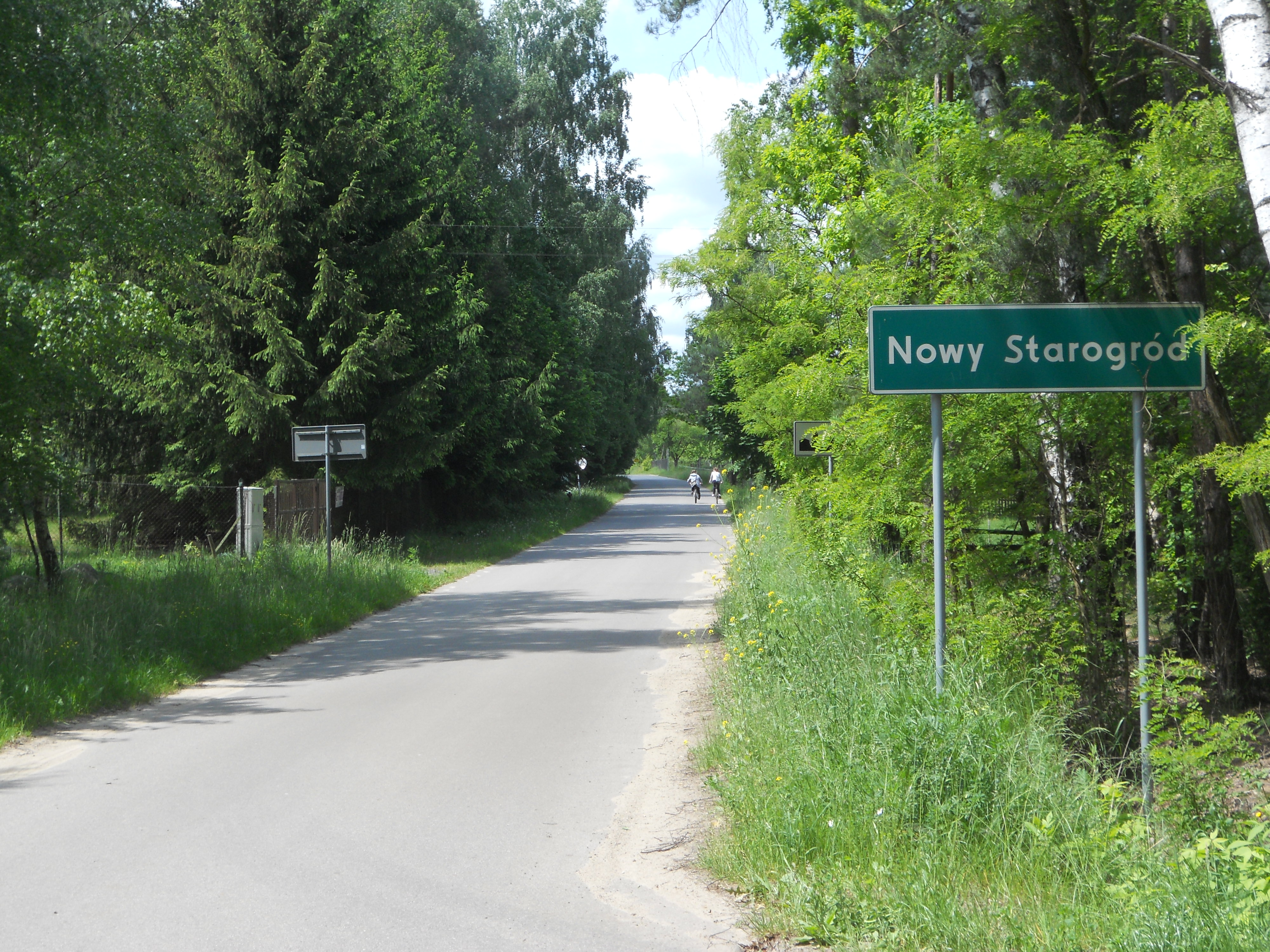
- Road sign leasing to Nowy Starogród

- Location within Poland
- Coordinates: 52°01′54″N 21°36′24″E
- Country: Poland
- Voivodeship: Masovian
- County: Mińsk
- Gmina: Siennica
- Population: 114

Nowy Starogród [ˈnɔvɨ staˈrɔɡrut] is a village in the administrative district of Gmina Siennica, within Mińsk County, Masovian Voivodeship, in east-central Poland.
