= Borówek, Gmina Siennica =

Borówek
- Village
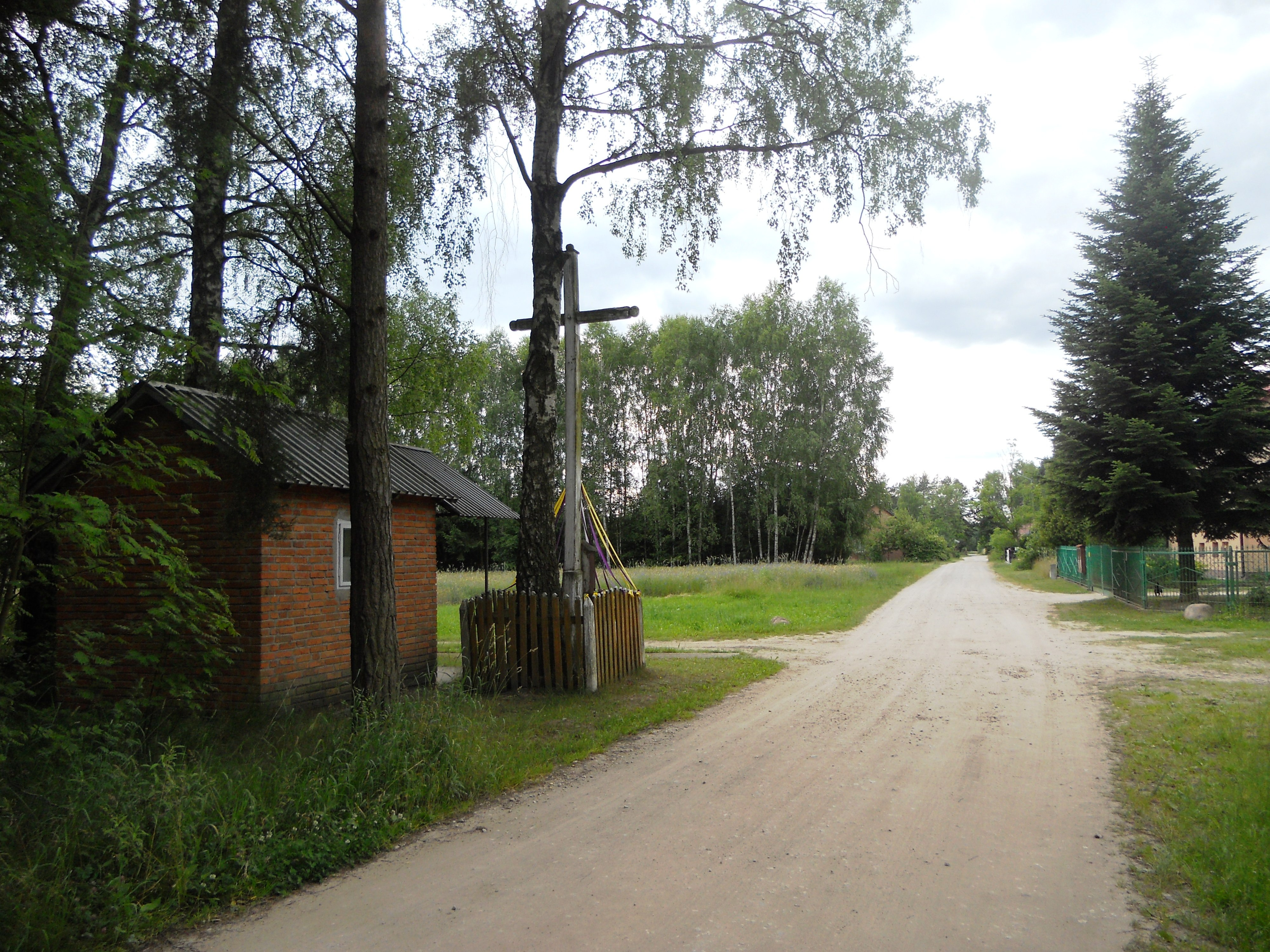

- Location within Poland
- Coordinates: 52°5′57″N 21°33′15″E
- Country: Poland
- Voivodeship: Masovian
- County: Mińsk
- Gmina: Siennica

Population
  - Total: 46

Borówek [bɔˈruvɛk] is a village in the administrative district of Gmina Siennica, within Mińsk County, Masovian Voivodeship, in east-central Poland.
