= Wola Polska, Mińsk County =

Wola Polska
- Village
- Location within Poland
- Coordinates: 52°15′38″N 21°39′57″E
- Country: Poland
- Voivodeship: Masovian
- County: Mińsk
- Gmina: Jakubów
- Population: 228

Wola Polska [ˈvɔla ˈpɔlska] is a village in the administrative district of Gmina Jakubów, within Mińsk County, Masovian Voivodeship, in east-central Poland.
