= Bestwiny =

- Village
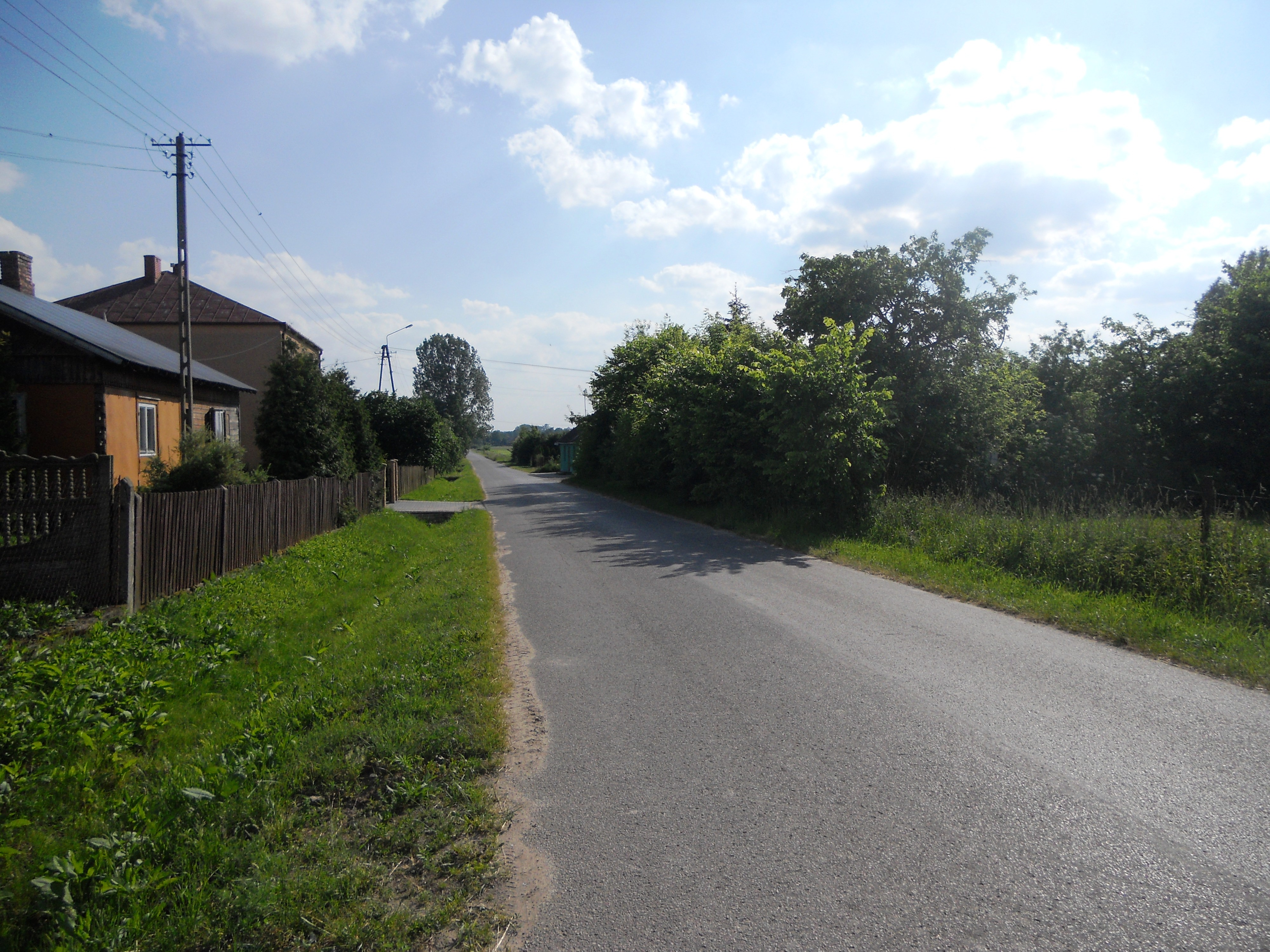

- Location within Poland
- Coordinates: 52°4′N 21°36′E
- Country: Poland
- Voivodeship: Masovian
- County: Mińsk
- Gmina: Siennica
- Population: 150

Bestwiny [bɛstˈfinɨ] is a village in the administrative district of Gmina Siennica, within Mińsk County, Masovian Voivodeship, in east-central Poland.
