= Doda Conrad =

American opera singer (1905-1997)

- Born: 19 February 1906; Szczytnik (Silesia)
- Died: 28 December 1997 (aged 92); Blois, France
- Occupation: Opera singer

Doda Conrad (19 February 1905 – 28 December 1997) was a Polish-born American bass operatic singer.

== Career ==
The son of Marya Freund, Conrad studied singing with Emilio de Gogorza in New York, then made his debut in Paris in 1932 at the École normale de musique de Paris and the Théâtre de la Porte-Saint-Martin. In 1936 he worked with Nadia Boulanger. He performed French songs, and lieder by Chopin and Schubert. He commissioned mouvement du cœur on poems by Louise de Vilmorin on music composed by Henri Sauguet, Jean Françaix, Francis Poulenc, Darius Milhaud, and visions infernales written by Henri Sauguet. In 1965 he no longer appeared on stage and was involved in music promotion. He founded he Erémurus company, the Saison musicale of the Abbaye de Royaumont and directed the journées musicales of Langeais. As a young man, he was destined for painting on the advice of Picasso and later became a close friend of Stravinsky and Saint-John Perse.

== Sources ==
- Pâris, Alain (1989). Dictionnaire des interprètes et de l'interprétation musicale au XXe. Bouquins. Paris: R. Laffont. pp. 284. ISBN 222106660X.
