= Drożdżówka, Masovian Voivodeship =

Drożdżówka
- Village
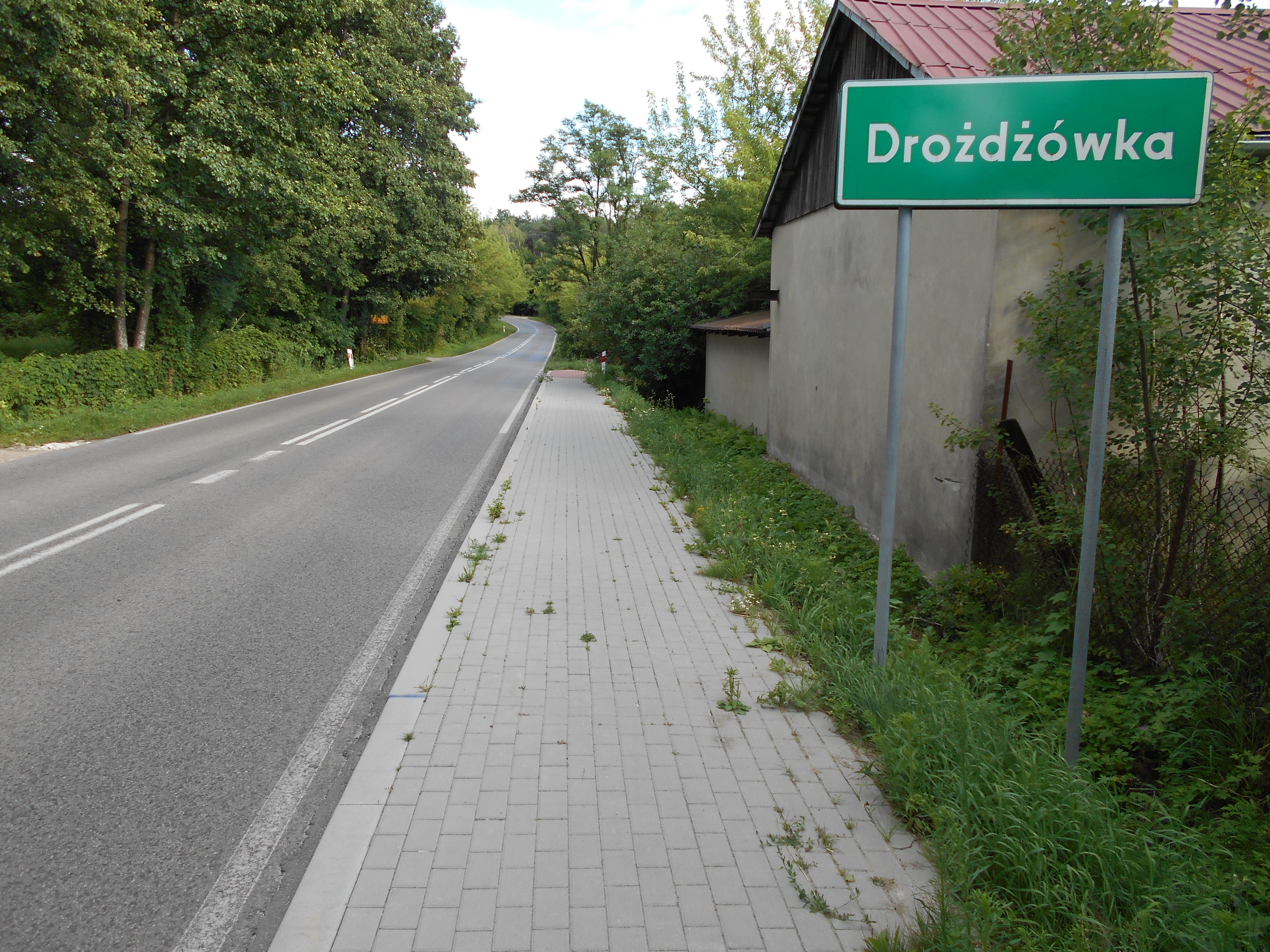
- Road sign leading to Drożdżówka

- Location within Poland
- Coordinates: 52°03′06″N 21°41′07″E
- Country: Poland
- Voivodeship: Masovian
- County: Mińsk
- Gmina: Siennica
- Population: 216

Drożdżówka [drɔʐˈd͡ʐufka] is a village in the administrative district of Gmina Siennica, within Mińsk County, Masovian Voivodeship, in east-central Poland.
