= Jędrzejów Nowy =

- Village
- Location within Poland
- Coordinates: 52°11′32″N 21°43′10″E
- Country: Poland
- Voivodeship: Masovian
- County: Mińsk
- Gmina: Jakubów
- Population: 40

Jędrzejów Nowy (Polish pronunciation: [jɛnˈdʐɛjuf ˈnɔvɨ]) is a village in the administrative district of Gmina Jakubów, within Mińsk County, Masovian Voivodeship, in east-central Poland.
