= Kąty, Mińsk County =

Kąty
- Village
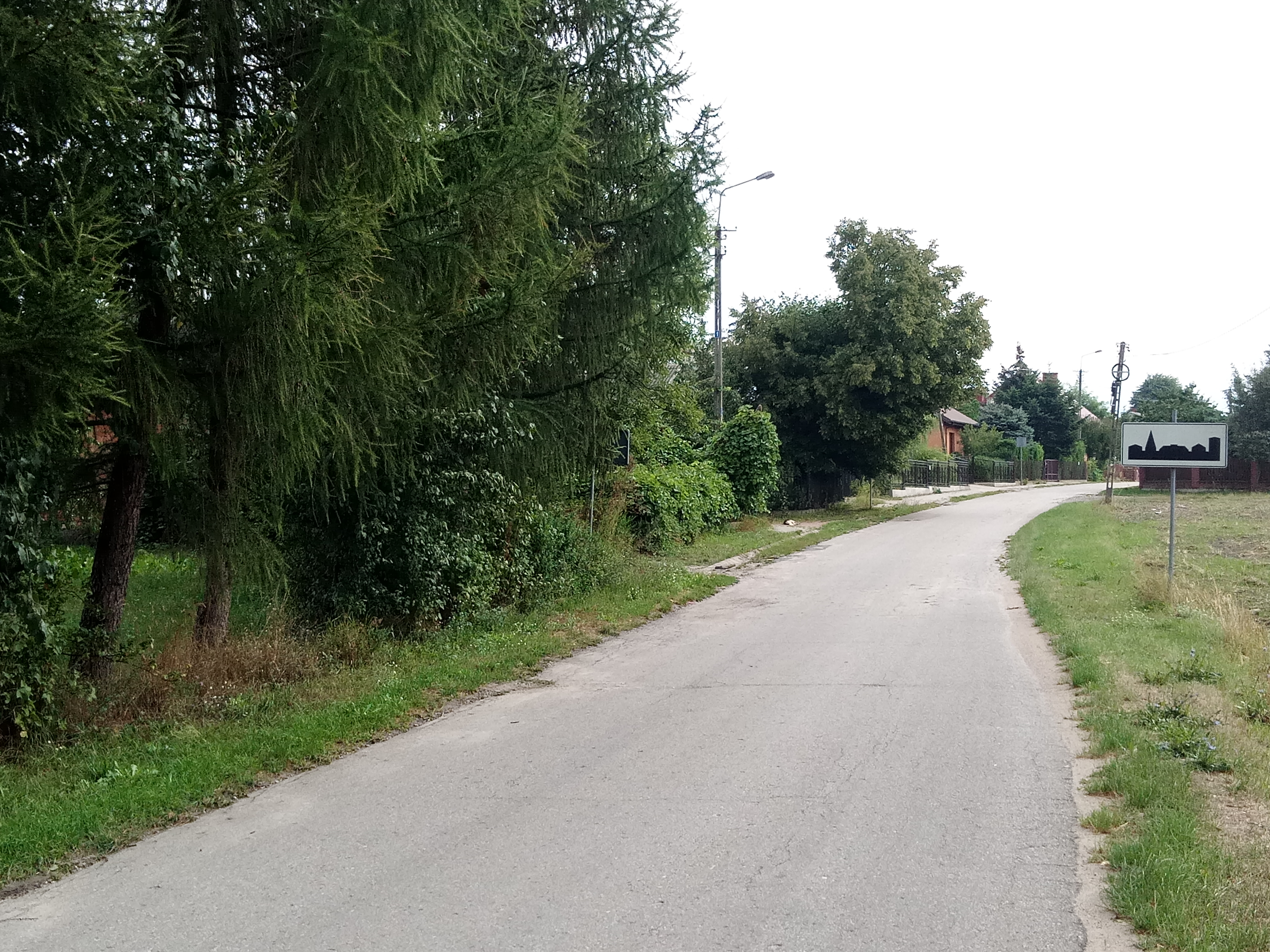

- Location within Poland
- Coordinates: 52°4′N 21°38′E
- Country: Poland
- Voivodeship: Masovian
- County: Mińsk
- Gmina: Siennica

Population
  - Total: 206
- Time zone: UTC+1 (CET)
  - Summer (DST): UTC+2 (CEST)

Kąty [ˈkɔntɨ] is a village in the administrative district of Gmina Siennica, within Mińsk County, Masovian Voivodeship, in east-central Poland.

Two Polish citizens were murdered by Nazi Germany in the village during World War II.
