= Starogród, Masovian Voivodeship =

Starogród
- Village
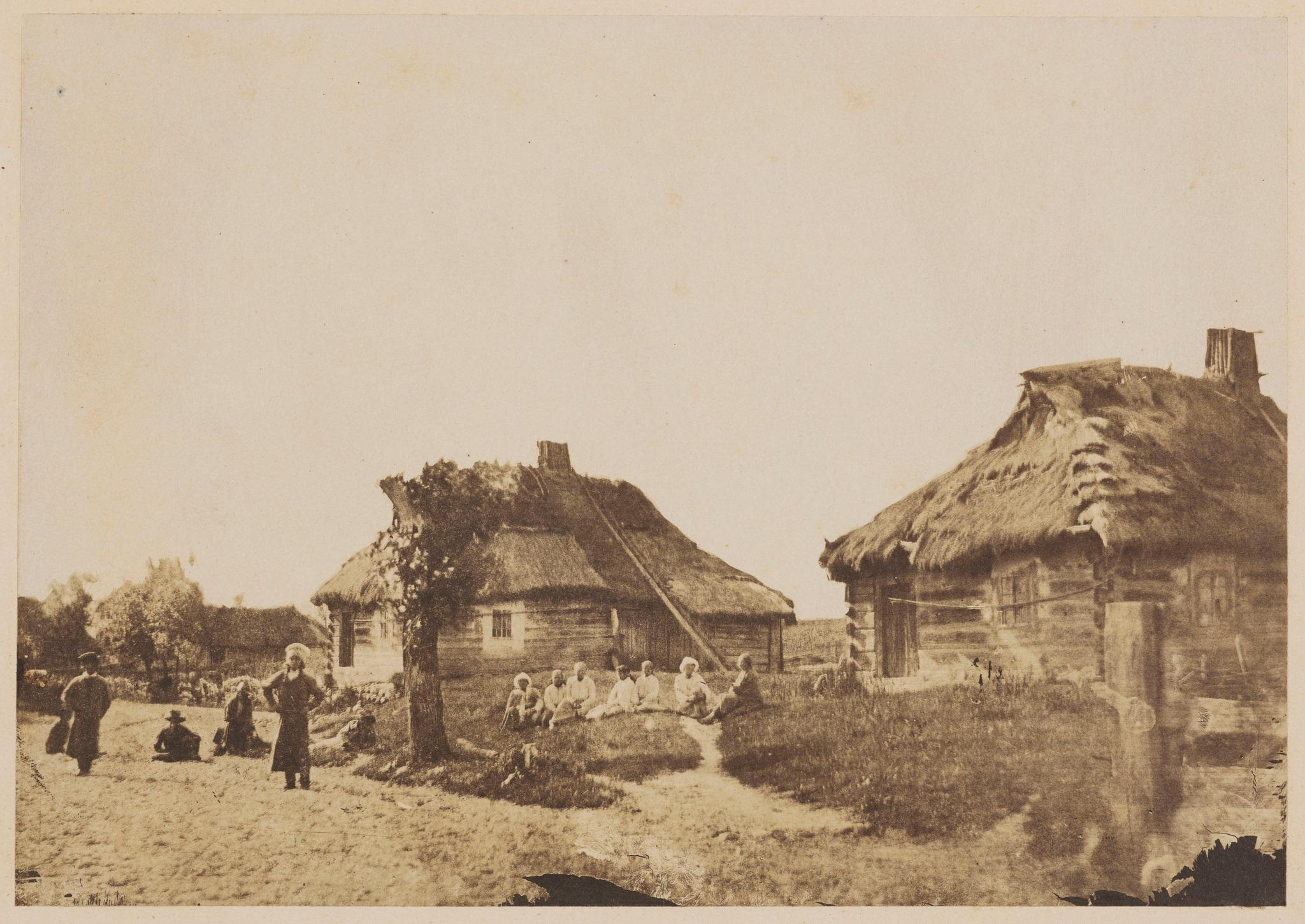
- Starogród in 1856

- Location within Poland
- Coordinates: 52°1′47″N 21°38′30″E
- Country: Poland
- Voivodeship: Masovian
- County: Mińsk
- Gmina: Siennica

Population
  - Total: 292
- Time zone: UTC+1 (CET)
  - Summer (DST): UTC+2 (CEST)
- Postal code: 05-332

Starogród [staˈrɔɡrut] is a village in the administrative district of Gmina Siennica, within Mińsk County, Masovian Voivodeship, in east-central Poland. It is situated on the Świder river.

== History ==
In 1827, it had a population of 236.

In the interwar period, it was administratively located in the Mińsk Mazowiecki County in the Warsaw Voivodeship. According to the 1921 census, the village with the adjacent manor farm had a population of 426, entirely Polish by nationality and 99.8% Roman Catholic by confession.
