= Siodło, Masovian Voivodeship =

Siodło
- Village
- Location within Poland
- Coordinates: 52°5′N 21°42′E
- Country: Poland
- Voivodeship: Masovian
- County: Mińsk
- Gmina: Siennica
- Population: 171

Siodło [ˈɕɔdwɔ] is a village in the administrative district of Gmina Siennica, within Mińsk County, Masovian Voivodeship, in east-central Poland.
