= Józefin, Gmina Jakubów =

Józefin
- Village
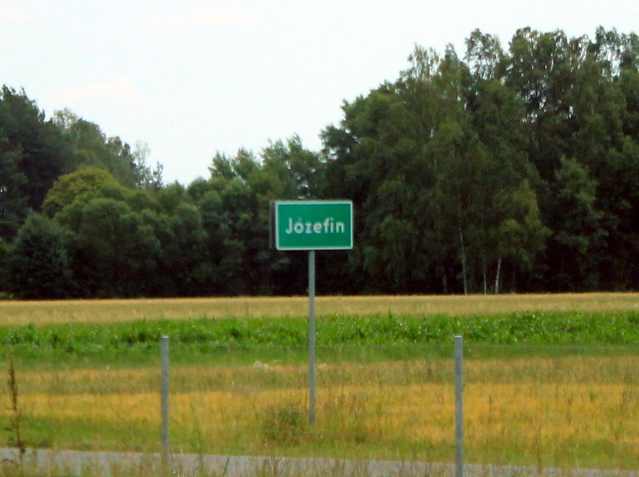

- Location within Poland
- Coordinates: 52°12′4″N 21°41′21″E
- Country: Poland
- Voivodeship: Masovian
- County: Mińsk
- Gmina: Jakubów

Józefin [juˈzɛfin] is a village in the administrative district of Gmina Jakubów, within Mińsk County, Masovian Voivodeship, in east-central Poland.
