= Swoboda, Mińsk County =

Swoboda
- Village
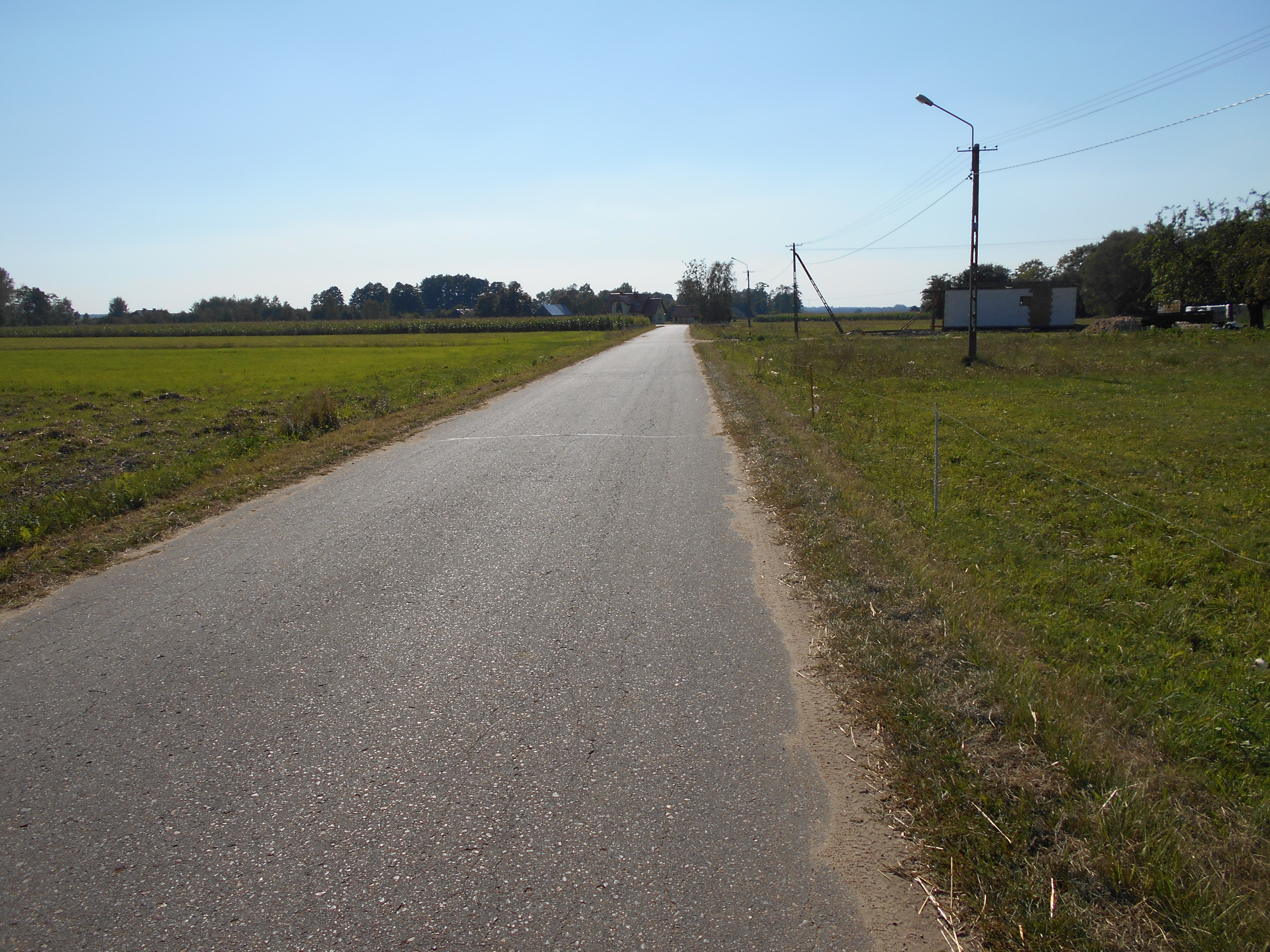

- Location within Poland
- Coordinates: 52°06′33″N 21°40′39″E
- Country: Poland
- Voivodeship: Masovian
- County: Mińsk
- Gmina: Siennica
- Population: 68

Swoboda [sfɔˈbɔda] is a village in the administrative district of Gmina Siennica, within Mińsk County, Masovian Voivodeship, in east-central Poland.
