= Gągolina =

- Village
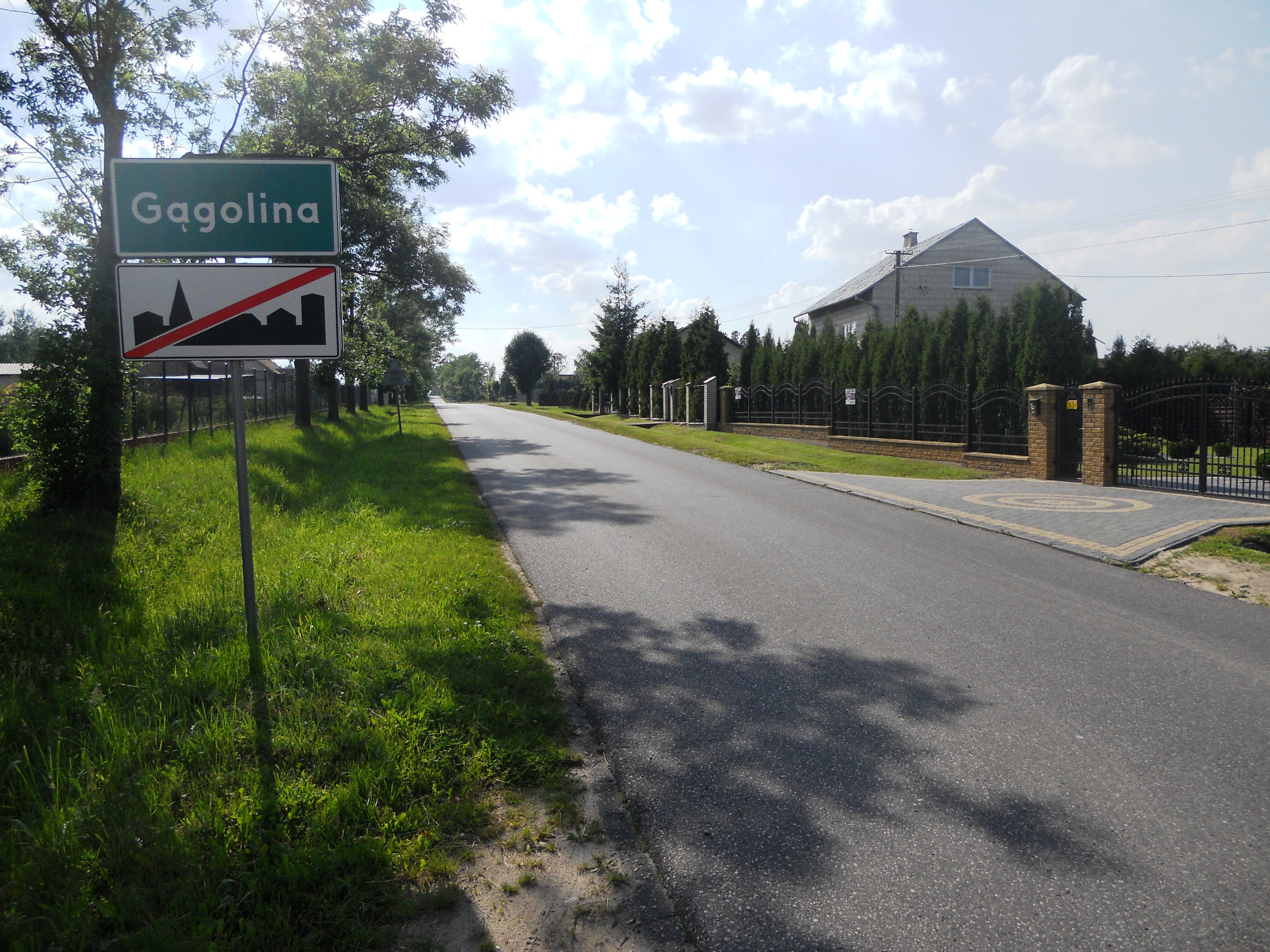
- Road sign in Gągolina

- Location within Poland
- Coordinates: 52°05′12″N 21°35′59″E
- Country: Poland
- Voivodeship: Masovian
- County: Mińsk
- Gmina: Siennica
- Population: 89

Gągolina [ɡɔnɡɔˈlina] is a village in the administrative district of Gmina Siennica, within Mińsk County, Masovian Voivodeship, in east-central Poland.

According to a 2021 census it has a population of 86.
