= Brzozówka, Mińsk County =

Brzozówka
- Village
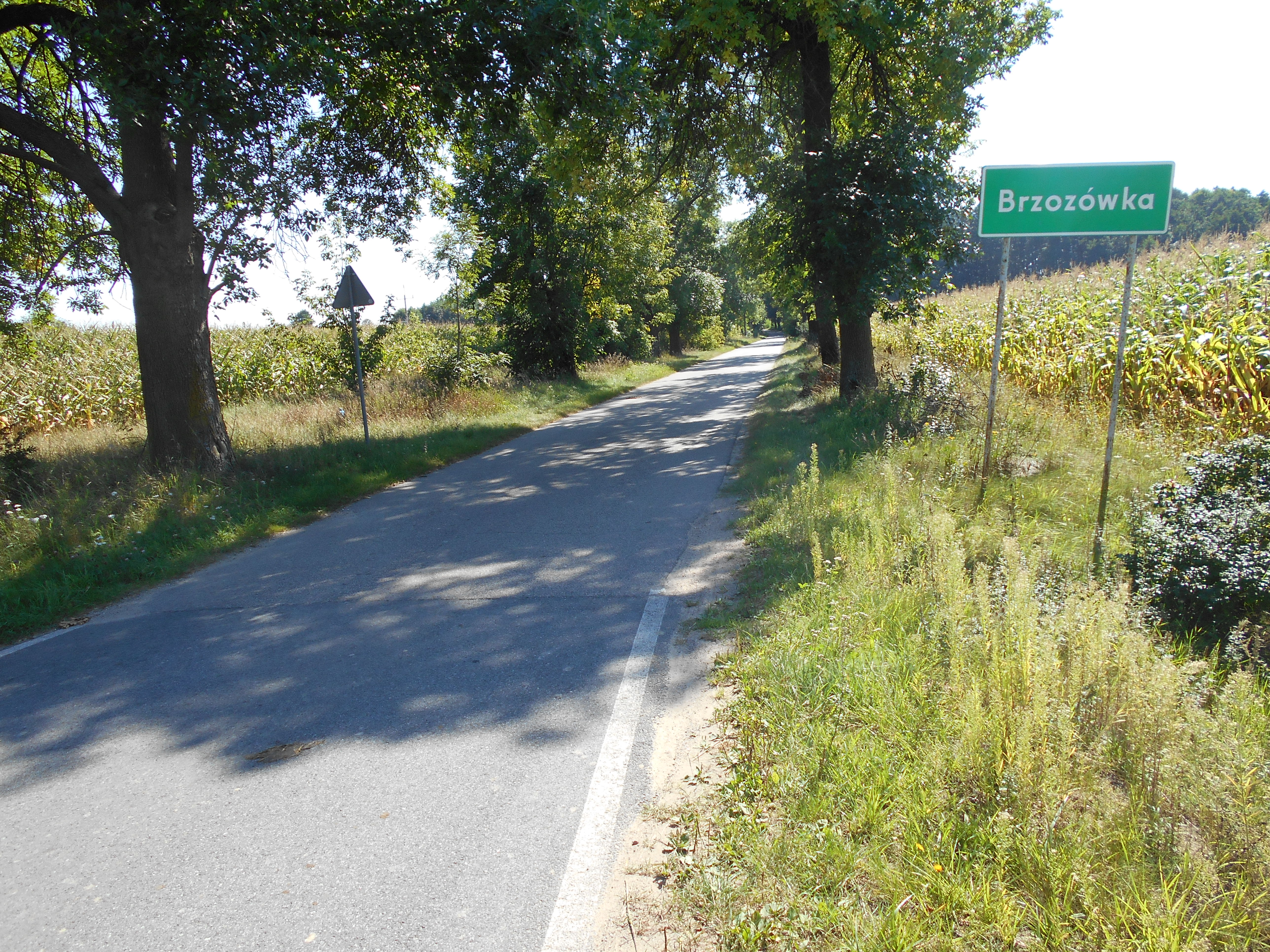
- Road leading to the village of Brzozówka, Jakubów

- Location within Poland
- Coordinates: 52°12′0″N 21°40′23″E
- Country: Poland
- Voivodeship: Masovian
- County: Mińsk
- Gmina: Jakubów
- Population: 74

Brzozówka [bʐɔˈzufka] is a village in the administrative district of Gmina Jakubów, within Mińsk County, Masovian Voivodeship, in east-central Poland.
