= Nowodzielnik =

- Village
- Location within Poland
- Coordinates: 52°04′13″N 21°41′14″E
- Country: Poland
- Voivodeship: Masovian
- County: Mińsk
- Gmina: Siennica
- Population: 28

Nowodzielnik [nɔvɔˈd͡ʑɛlnik] is a village in the administrative district of Gmina Siennica, within Mińsk County, Masovian Voivodeship, in east-central Poland.
