= Nowodwór, Masovian Voivodeship =

Nowodwór
- Village
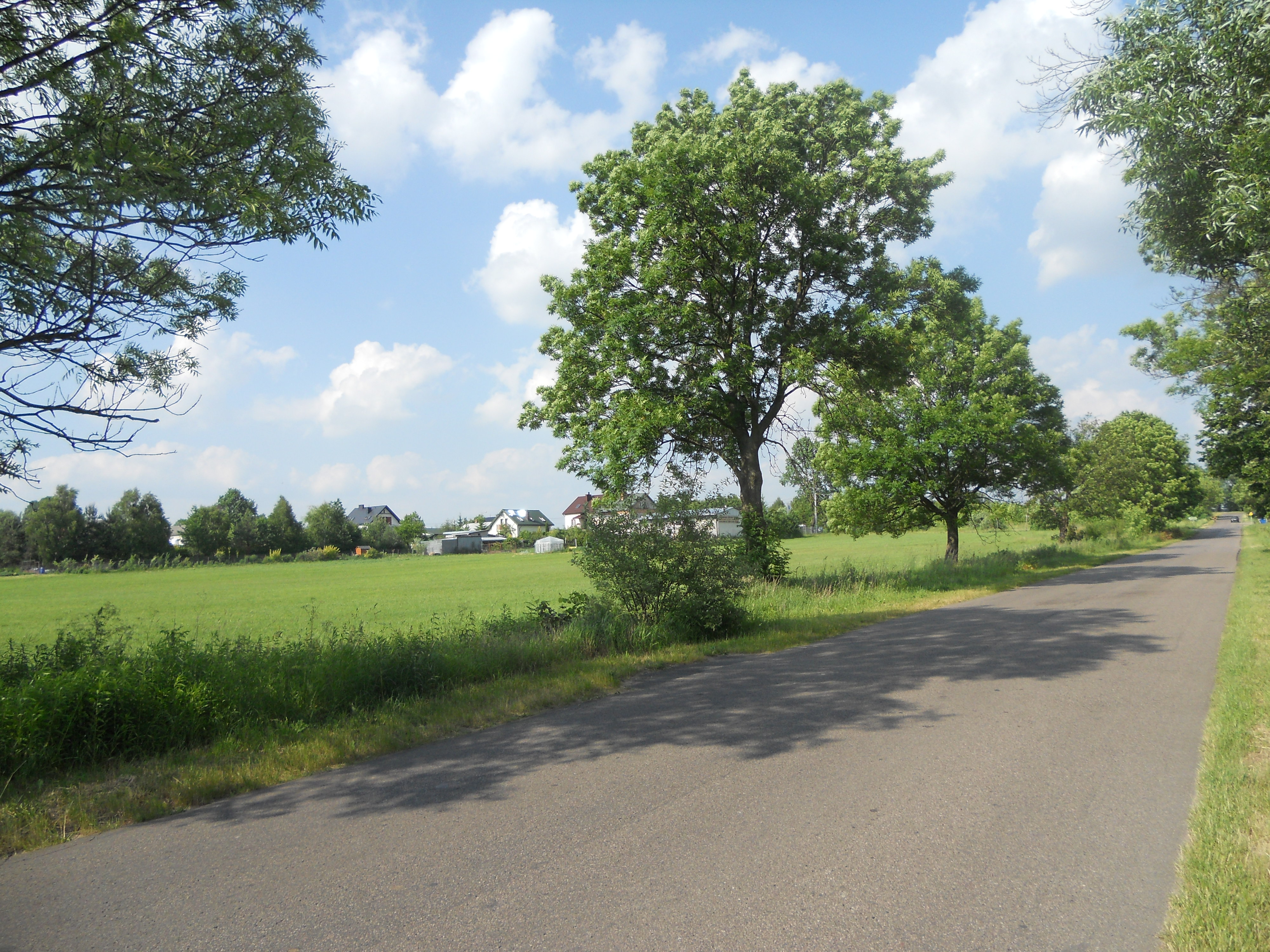
- Road in Nowodwór

- Location within Poland
- Coordinates: 52°05′19″N 21°35′22″E
- Country: Poland
- Voivodeship: Masovian
- County: Mińsk
- Gmina: Siennica
- Population: 153

Nowodwór [nɔˈvɔdvur] is a village in the administrative district of Gmina Siennica, within Mińsk County, Masovian Voivodeship, in east-central Poland.
