= Jakubów, Mińsk County =

Jakubów
- Village
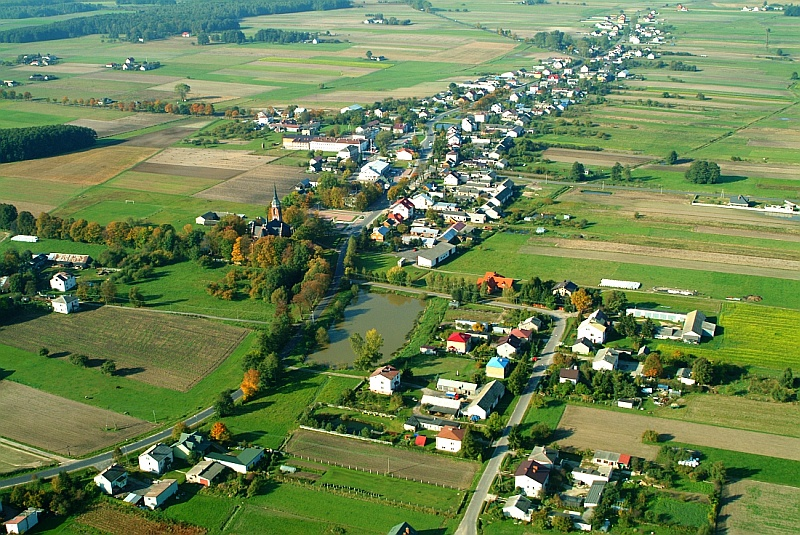
- Aerial view

- Coat of arms

- Location within Poland
- Coordinates: 52°13′8″N 21°40′38″E
- Country: Poland
- Voivodeship: Masovian
- County: Mińsk
- Gmina: Jakubów
- Population: 644

Jakubów [jaˈkubuf] is a village in Mińsk County, Masovian Voivodeship, in east-central Poland. It is the seat of the gmina (administrative district) called Gmina Jakubów.
