= Ferdynand Grüning =

Polish serial killer and rapist

- Born: 6 August 1885; Łódź, Russian Empire
- Died: After 16 August 1939 (age at least 52 or 53)
- Cause of death: Likely hanged
- Other names: "The Łódź Vampire", Ferdynand Grining
- Occupations: tinsmith, weaver
- Convictions: Murder x3 Attempted murder x1 Rape x2
- Penalty: Death (latter murders); Life imprisonment (Erentzówna)

Details
- Victims: 3
- Span of crimes: 1926–1938
- Country: Poland
- State: Łódź
- Date apprehended: 17 October 1938

Ferdynand Grüning or Ferdynand Grining (6 August 1885 – after 16 August 1939), known as the Łódź Vampire (Polish: Wampir z Łodzi), was a Polish serial killer and child rapist who killed three children across Poland from 1926 to 1938 during the interwar period. He was sentenced to death for his crimes, but due to the outbreak of the Second World War shortly after, it is unknown if this sentence was carried out.

== Early life ==
Ferdynand Grüning was born in 1885 in Łódź, one of six children and the second son of Adela Fabian and Krzysztof Grüning born in an ethnic German family who lived on Włodzimierska Street (now Jan Pietrusiński Street). In his youth, he was described as a quiet, calm and orderly child, who had no friends and was considered a loner. While he was taught German at home, he attended a Russian-language school. He had a brother, August, and four sisters, two of whom died in infancy. As he grew older, Grüning started to become violent and throw tantrums at his family, threatening to beat them or gnashing his teeth at them.

His behaviour worsened after his short stint in the Imperial Russian Army, from which he was expelled, probably due to his sexual tendencies. After returning home, he became even more nervous and refused to work at all. Despite his problems, Grüning married a woman, but the marriage proved to be troubling due to the death of the couple's daughter at birth, as well as his alcoholism. Because of this, Grüning eventually abandoned his wife and decided to become an itinerant tinsmith. Over time, it came to be believed that he was forced to marry by his family, while his sisters suspected that he did it in an attempt to find an outlet for his sexual proclivities.

According to older brother August Grüning, Ferdynand was imprisoned for raping a 5-year-old named Władysława Jezierska in 1914, but released after the outbreak of the First World War. His freedom did not last long, as he was sentenced to a year of imprisonment for theft. According to prison guards, Grüning was a model inmate who behaved in an exemplary manner during his incarceration.

=== Murders ===
In 1926, Grüning was convicted of raping and killing 7-year-old Irena Erentzówna (or Francówna) in the village of Turek, for which he was sentenced to life imprisonment at the Rawicz Prison. In 1932, his sentence was reduced to 12 years following a general amnesty, and two years later, Grüning, who was suffering from an ocular disease he had acquired in prison, was released on medical grounds.

On 30 May 1934, Grüning approached a group of boys playing football on the square of Aleksandrowska Street in Zgierz, offering one of them, Tadeusz Kuczyński, to accompany him to a tram where he would offer him some sweets. Kuczyński refused, and so, Grüning instead extended his offer to 11-year-old Józef Chudobiński (or Kłudowiński), offering 50 groszy to buy him some candy. Chudobiński agreed and went with Grüning, but failed to return in the evening, prompting his father to start searching for him. The boy's skeleton was found in a field by a farmer in the village of Piaskowice Pieńki six weeks later. He was identified by a cap with his name and surname etched onto it, bearing the signature "Józef Chudobiński, cl. IV". Despite interacting with the children at the time of the crime, Grüning was not suspected, but was instead imprisoned for an unrelated crime not long after. After spending two years in prison, he was released in 1938.

On 8 July 1938, Grüning raped and attempted to kill 8-year-old Lucyna Góra in Piotrków Trybunalski, but she managed to escape. When questioned about her injuries, Góra initially claimed that she had hurt herself while riding a bicycle with her "uncle", but later admitted that she was attacked after learning about her assailant's other crimes.

On 17 October, Grüning arrived in the village of Kościuszko, near Kutno, and visited the mayor, asking for accommodation. While the mayor was referring him to a local villager named Bembnista, two 9-year-old girls came to visit, attracting Grüning's attention. He started a conversation with the pair, suggesting that he could solder pots in their homes. One of the girls, Władysława Bagrowska, agreed to the idea and later led him to her house. Around 7 pm, Grüning visited Bembnista for his overnight stay and washed himself thoroughly. Despite the fact that the host noticed that he was covered in blood, it did not arouse suspicion, as Bembnista believed that he might have cut himself while working.

=== Arrest, trial and fate ===
After his daughter failed to return home, Bagrowska's father went to the mayor to ask for help. Around 10 pm, the two visited Bembnista and asked for the newcomer's whereabouts, with the former replying that he was sleeping in the barn. Upon waking him up, the father demanded to know where his daughter was, but Grüning simply replied that he was "not a guardian of other people's children." After they left, Grüning got up and attempted to clean the bloodied scissors, but was caught by an arriving officer, who also noticed that he had blood on his clothing. After being brought to the police station, Grüning admitted that he had killed Bagrowska and that he had buried her body in a field, whose location he indicated to the investigators. Upon arriving there, the policemen saw that the child's hand was sticking out of the ground and that her clothes were right next to it, with further inspections of the barn revealing dismembered pieces of her corpse in it, right next to where Grüning had slept. When pressed for an explanation, he claimed that he was overcome with a lust for murder. Soon after, he was also linked to the murder and attempted murder from years prior, with which he was all charged.

Before his trial began, Grüning was sent for a mental evaluation at two hospitals, one in Kochanówka and another in Tworki. In both institutions, he admitted guilt and described his crimes in detail, leading the doctors to conclude that he was sane. His trial took place at the Regional Court of Łódź on 28 February 1939, where crowds of onlookers gathered outside the building during the trial. Throughout the proceedings, Grüning sat on the bench with his head lowered and his eyes staring at the floor, and when he was asked questions, he claimed that he did not know the answers. He also pretended that he did not know his name or whether he was married, and flat out refused to admit responsibility or give explanations for his crimes.

Despite his denials, Chudobiński's friends testified before the court and identified him as the mysterious man who had talked to their friend shortly before his abduction; similar testimonies were also given by Lucyna Góra, the family members of other victims and Grüning's own siblings. Due to the nature of his crimes, part of the trial was held in secret.

Eventually, he was convicted on all counts, receiving three death sentences for two counts of murder and rape, and a single count of attempted murder. In addition, he was deprived of his rights for life. At the sentencing phase, the court emphasized on Grüning's "lack of human instincts, animalism and cruelty", and upon hearing the sentence, he accepted it calmly and without no apparent emotion.

After he was sent to prison, it is unclear whether Grüning's sentence was carried out. The last confirmed fact known about him is that on 16 August 1939, when his brother was being tried for theft, he was registered as still being in prison. Two weeks after that, the Second World War began, and all traces of him after this point are lost.

== See also ==
- List of serial killers by country
