= Nowe Zalesie, Masovian Voivodeship =

Nowe Zalesie
- Village
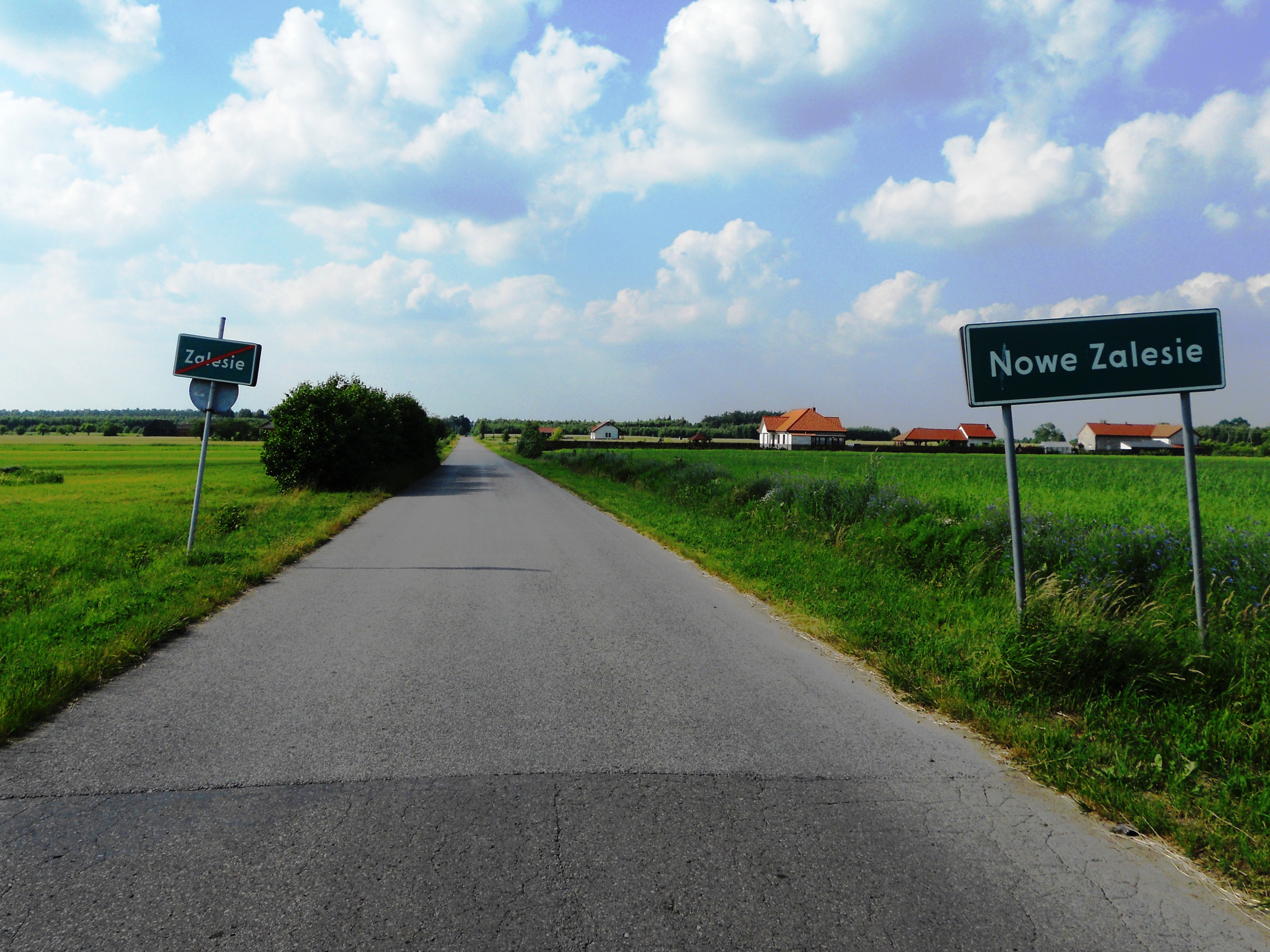
- Road sign in Nowe Zalesie

- Location within Poland
- Coordinates: 52°05′51″N 21°34′26″E
- Country: Poland
- Voivodeship: Masovian
- County: Mińsk
- Gmina: Siennica
- Population: 51

Nowe Zalesie [ˈnɔvɛ zaˈlɛɕɛ] is a village in the administrative district of Gmina Siennica, within Mińsk County, Masovian Voivodeship, in east-central Poland.
