= Nart, Masovian Voivodeship =

Nart
- Village
- Location within Poland
- Coordinates: 52°16′25″N 21°44′44″E
- Country: Poland
- Voivodeship: Masovian
- County: Mińsk
- Gmina: Jakubów
- Population: 70

Nart [nart] is a village in the administrative district of Gmina Jakubów, within Mińsk County, Masovian Voivodeship, in east-central Poland.
