= Turek, Masovian Voivodeship =

Turek
- Village
- Location within Poland
- Coordinates: 52°16′N 21°46′E
- Country: Poland
- Voivodeship: Masovian
- County: Mińsk
- Gmina: Jakubów
- Population: 135

Turek [ˈturɛk] is a village in the administrative district of Gmina Jakubów, within Mińsk County, Masovian Voivodeship, in east-central Poland.
