= Sulejówek =

Town in Masovian Voivodeship, Poland

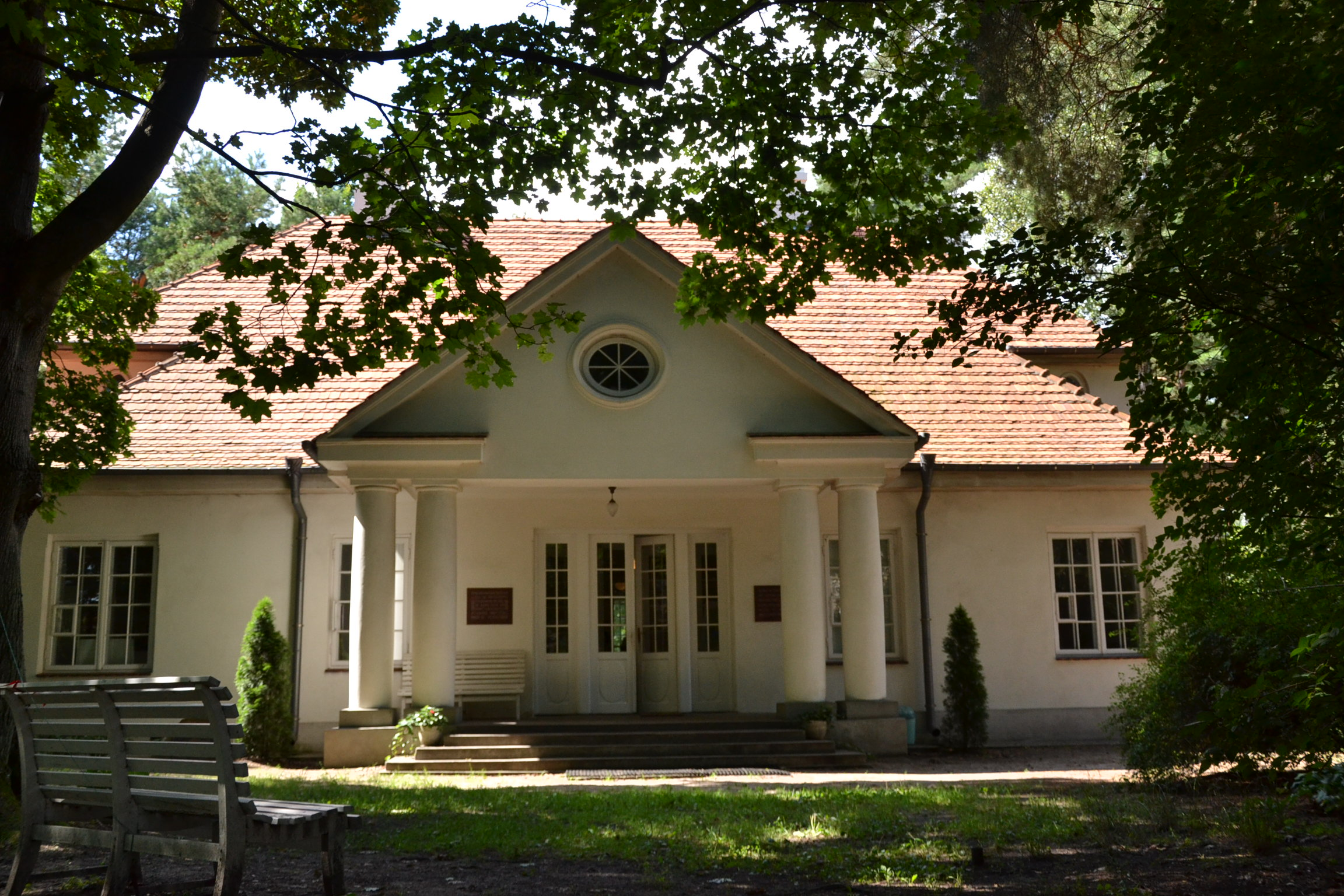
- Manor of Józef Piłsudski

- Flag Coat of arms

- Location within Poland
- Coordinates: 52°14′39″N 21°16′48″E
- Country: Poland
- Voivodeship: Masovian
- County: Mińsk
- Gmina: Sulejówek (urban gmina)
- First mentioned: 1526
- Town rights: 1962

Government
  - Mayor: Arkadiusz Śliwa

Area
  - Total: 19.51 km^{2} (7.53 sq mi)

Population (2013)
  - Total: 19,311
  - Density: 989.8/km^{2} (2,564/sq mi)
- Time zone: UTC+1 (CET)
  - Summer (DST): UTC+2 (CEST)
- Postal code: 05-070, 05-071
- Area code: +48 22
- Car plates: WM
- Website: http://www.sulejowek.pl

Sulejówek [sulɛˈjuvɛk] is a town in Poland, about 18 km (11 mi) east of Warsaw city centre and part of the Warsaw metropolitan area. It is located in Masovian Voivodeship, in Mińsk County. Its population numbers 19,323 (2011).

The town is well known in Poland as the place where Józef Piłsudski lived in the years between 1923 and 1926. The former manor houses the Józef Piłsudski Museum and is listed as a Historic Monument of Poland.

== History ==
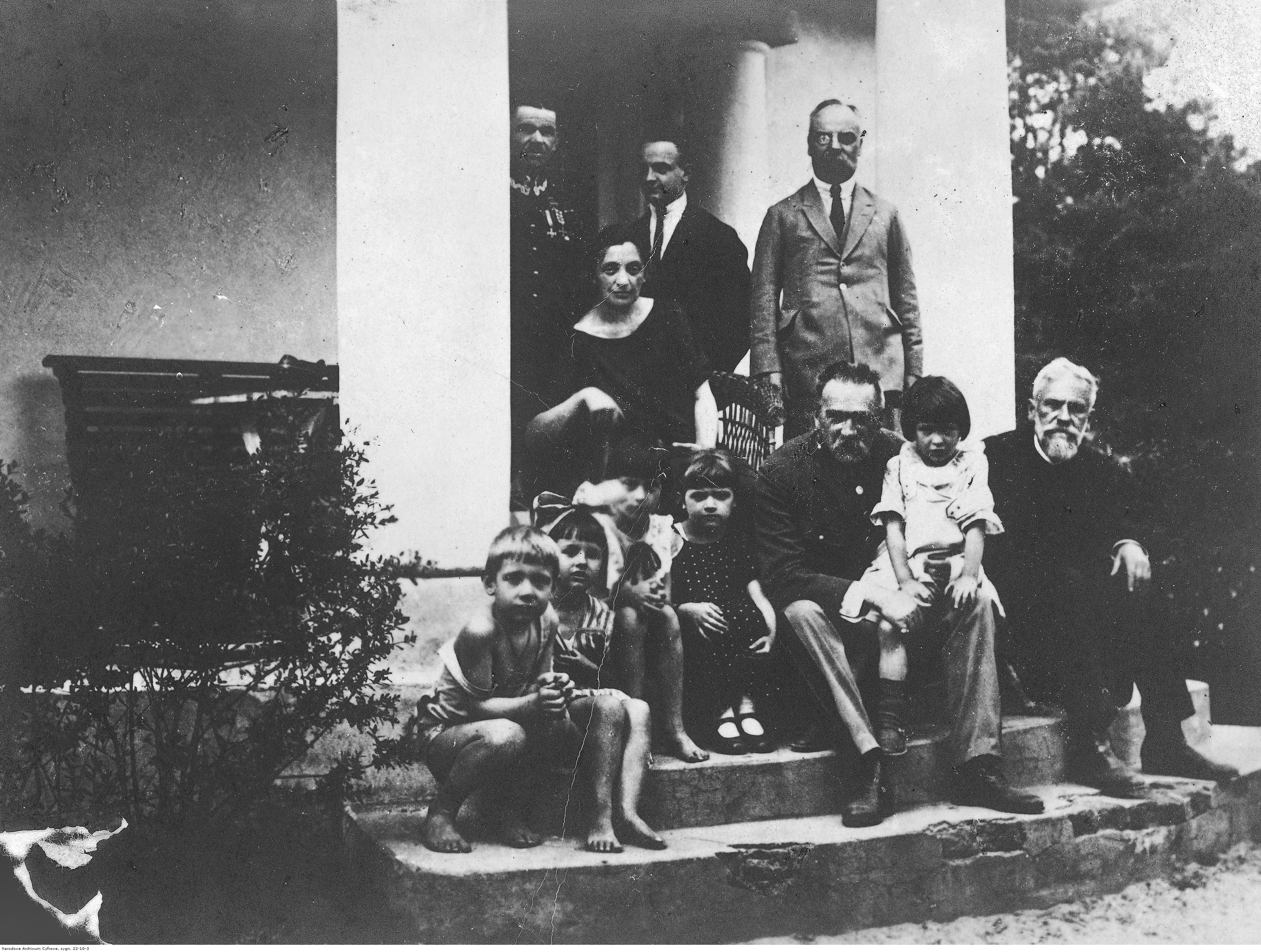
Marshal Józef Piłsudski with his wife, daughters and close associates with their children in Sulejówek in 1925

The oldest known mention of the settlement comes from 1526. Sulejówek was a private village of Polish nobility, administratively located in the Warsaw County in the Masovian Voivodeship in the Greater Poland Province of the Kingdom of Poland.

In 1815, Sulejówek fell to the Russian Partition of Poland. Polish insurgents operated in the area during the January Uprising of 1863–1864. On 8 August 1863 the settlement of Miłosna (present-day district of Sulejówek) was attacked by Cossacks, but the surprised local Polish insurgent unit managed to escape. In revenge, the Cossacks attacked and robbed the local post office, wounded and captured the postmen, taking them to Warsaw. Another clash between the insurgents and the Russians took place in Miłosna on 25 January 1864. Following World War I, in 1918, Poland regained independence and control of Sulejówek. In August 1920, during the Battle of Warsaw, the first line of Polish defense against the Russian invaders passed through Sulejówek, however, there was no direct fighting in this sector (see: Polish–Soviet War).

In 1919, Polish composer and statesman Ignacy Jan Paderewski and his wife Helena Paderewska bought a villa ("Białynia") in Sulejówek and established an Educational Institute, which was financially supported by Marshal of Poland Józef Piłsudski. Piłsudski himself lived in another house ("Milusin") in Sulejówek in 1923–1926. It currently houses a museum dedicated to him, and is listed as a Historic Monument of Poland. Jędrzej Moraczewski, second Prime Minister of interwar Poland, also lived in Sulejówek, in the "Siedziba" Manor House.

During the German invasion of Poland which started World War II, on 15 September 1939 the Germans committed two massacres of Poles in Sulejówek and the present-day district of Długa Szlachecka, killing over 50 and 42 people respectively (see Nazi crimes against the Polish nation). Six Polish officers from Sulejówek were murdered by the Russians in the large Katyn massacre in April–May 1940.

== Sports ==
The local football club is Victoria Sulejówek. It competes in the lower leagues.

== International relations ==
=== Twin towns — Sister cities ===
Sulejówek is twinned with:

- Viimsi Parish, Estonia
