= Gmina Siennica =

Gmina Siennica Siennica Commune
- Gmina
- Coat of arms
- Interactive map of Gmina Siennica
- Coordinates (Siennica): 52°5′N 21°37′E
- Country: Poland
- Voivodeship: Masovian
- County: Mińsk
- Seat: Siennica

Area
  - Total: 111 km^{2} (43 sq mi)

Population (2013)
  - Total: 7,332
  - Density: 66.1/km^{2} (171/sq mi)
- Website: http://siennica.samorzad.pl/

Gmina Siennica is a rural gmina (administrative district) in Mińsk County, Masovian Voivodeship, in east-central Poland. Its seat is the village of Siennica, which lies approximately 10 kilometres (6 mi) south-east of Mińsk Mazowiecki and 44 km (27 mi) south-east of Warsaw.

The gmina covers an area of 111 square kilometres (42.9 sq mi), and as of 2006 its total population is 6,912 (7,334 in 2013).

== Massacre during Second World War ==
During the German Invasion of Poland in 1939, German soldiers from Wehrmacht mass murdered 22 Poles and 2 Jews in Siennica in what is described as "sadistic beating by iron tools" and shooting between 13 and 14 September. The responsible German soldiers proclaimed to the gathered population that the Poles "pigs". The villagers were trapped and imprisoned in an historic church which the Germans shot at, terrifying the imprisoned people. At the same time two women with children were told they could go home, when they did, the Germans set fire to their homes and the women barely escaped with their lives, hiding outside the village. When some of the people tried to fulfil their physiological needs the German soldiers humiliated them and told that those who want can go outside the church. When some tried to do that, they were brutally beaten. During the murder other German soldiers used incendiary grenades to burn down 70 buildings. The village was destroyed in 80% and the historic church destroyed.

== Villages ==
Gmina Siennica contains the villages and settlements of Bestwiny, Borówek, Boża Wola, Budy Łękawickie, Chełst, Dąbrowa, Dłużew, Drożdżówka, Dzielnik, Gągolina, Grzebowilk, Julianów, Kąty, Kośminy, Krzywica, Kulki, Lasomin, Łękawica, Majdan, Nowa Pogorzel, Nowe Zalesie, Nowodwór, Nowodzielnik, Nowy Starogród, Nowy Zglechów, Pogorzel, Ptaki, Siennica, Siodło, Stara Wieś, Starogród, Strugi Krzywickie, Świętochy, Swoboda, Wojciechówka, Wólka Dłużewska, Żaków, Żakówek, Zalesie and Zglechów.

== Neighbouring gminas ==
Gmina Siennica is bordered by the gminas of Cegłów, Kołbiel, Latowicz, Mińsk Mazowiecki, Parysów and Pilawa.
