= Marya Freund =

French soprano (1876–1966)

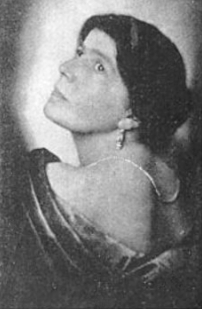
- In Musical Advance, December 1923
- Born: 12 December 1876; Breslau, German Empire
- Died: 21 May 1966 (aged 89); Paris, France
- Occupation: Soprano operatic singer

Marya Freund (12 December 1876 – 21 May 1966) was a German-born French soprano.

== Career ==
She studied violin with Pablo de Sarasate, then singing with Henri Criticos and Raymond Zur Mühlen. In 1913 she took part in the creation of Arnold Schoenberg's Gurrelieder in Vienna and became the appointed interpreter of the Pierrot lunaire. Her repertoire, especially that of the 20th, included Gustav Mahler, Gabriel Fauré, Claude Debussy, Maurice Ravel, Igor Stravinsky, Francis Poulenc, Karol Szymanowski. She worked within the circle of Satie, Cocteau and Les Six, appearing in the premiere of Satie's Socrate in 1920.

In the 1920s, she began a career as a teacher and gave some advice to Germaine Lubin. Jewish, she was arrested in February 1944 in occupied France. On the intervention of Alfred Cortot, she was released from the Drancy internment camp and transferred to the Rothschild Hospital. Marya Freund was the mother of bass singer Doda Conrad.

== Sources ==
- Alain Paris Dictionnaire des interprètes Bouquins/Robert Laffont 1990 (p. 382) ISBN 2-221-06660-X
