= Gmina Jakubów =

Gmina Jakubów Jakubów Commune
- Gmina
- Coat of arms
- Interactive map of Gmina Jakubów
- Coordinates (Jakubów): 52°13′8″N 21°40′38″E
- Country: Poland
- Voivodeship: Masovian
- County: Mińsk
- Seat: Jakubów

Area
  - Total: 87.23 km^{2} (33.68 sq mi)

Population (2013)
  - Total: 5,078
  - Density: 58.21/km^{2} (150.8/sq mi)
- Website: http://www.jakubow.pl/

Gmina Jakubów is a rural gmina (administrative district) in Mińsk County, Masovian Voivodeship, in east-central Poland. Its seat is the village of Jakubów, which lies approximately 8 kilometres (5 mi) north-east of Mińsk Mazowiecki and 45 km (28 mi) east of Warsaw.

The gmina covers an area of 87.23 square kilometres (33.7 sq mi), and as of 2006 its total population is 4,962 (5,078 in 2013).

== Villages ==
Gmina Jakubów contains the villages and settlements of Aleksandrów, Anielinek, Antonin, Brzozówka, Budy Kumińskie, Góry, Izabelin, Jakubów, Jędrzejów Nowy, Jędrzejów Stary, Józefin, Kamionka, Łaziska, Leontyna, Ludwinów, Mistów, Moczydła, Nart, Przedewsie, Rządza, Strzebula, Szczytnik, Turek, Tymoteuszew, Wiśniew and Wola Polska.

== Neighbouring gminas ==
Gmina Jakubów is bordered by the gminas of Cegłów, Dobre, Kałuszyn, Mińsk Mazowiecki and Stanisławów.
