= Siennica, Mińsk County =

Siennica
- Town
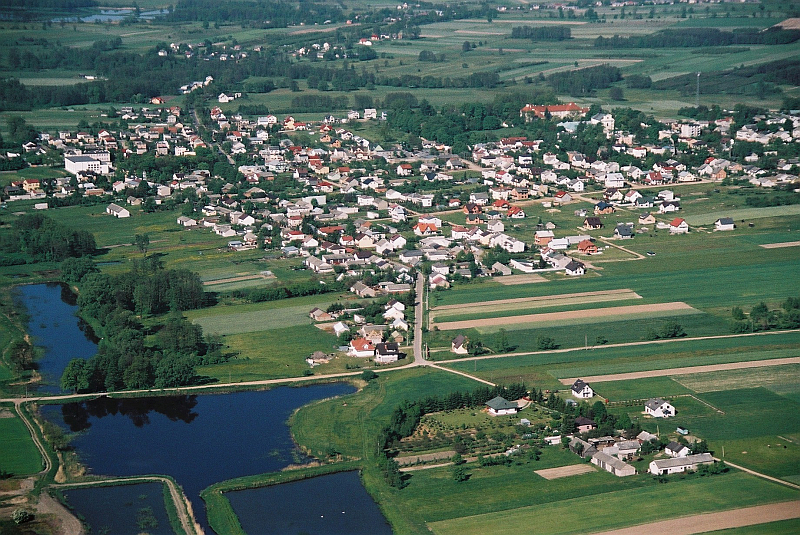
- Bird's eye view of Siennica

- Coat of arms

- Location within Poland
- Coordinates: 52°5′N 21°37′E
- Country: Poland
- Voivodeship: Masovian
- County: Mińsk
- Gmina: Siennica
- Town rights: 1526

Population
  - Total: 2,600
- Time zone: UTC+1 (CET)
  - Summer (DST): UTC+2 (CEST)
- Vehicle registration: WM
- Website: http://www.ugsiennica.pl/

Siennica [ɕɛnˈnit͡sa] is a town in Mińsk County, Masovian Voivodeship, in east-central Poland. It is the seat of the gmina (administrative district) called Gmina Siennica.

== History ==
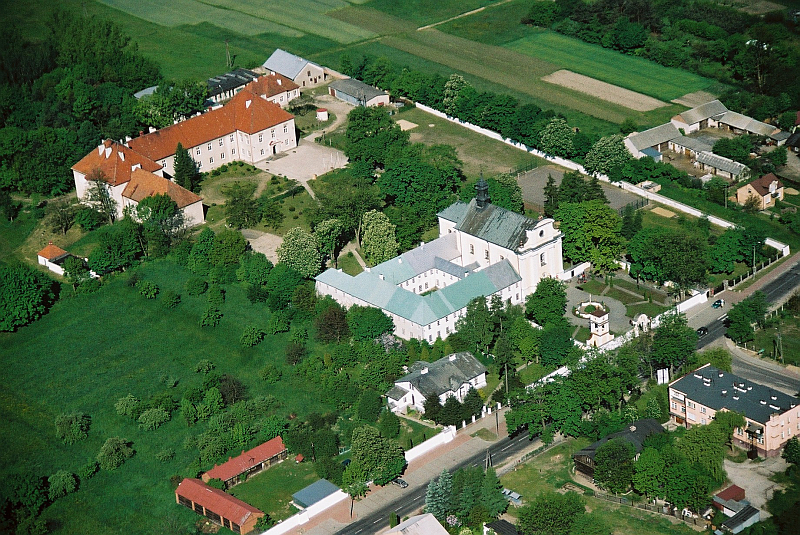
Baroque Church in Siennica, in the centre

The village was first mentioned in early 15th century as Szenic. In 1526 Duchess Anna of Masovia founded the town of Janów at the site of Siennica. It was granted Chełmno rights by Anna, confirmed by King Sigismund I the Old in 1527. Two years later, a Catholic parish was established there. Notably, in 1564 the town returned to its old name according to census. In 1577 a new church was built with larch bales in place of an old one. A chapel was built next to the church, where members of the local noble Siennicki family were buried. A second church was constructed in 1693–1698, augmented by the construction of a monastery and church of Blessed Virgin Mary in 1749–1760.

In 1815, it fell to the Russian Partition of Poland. In 1864 the Russian imperial authorities liquidated the monastery as part of their anti-Polish repressions after the unsuccessful Polish January Uprising; nevertheless, two years later a theological college was founded there by the Catholics. In 1869 Siennica lost its civic rights by a Tsarist decree. After World War I, in 1918, Poland regained independence and control of Siennica.

On 13 September 1939, Nazi German troops entered Siennica and burned it down. Following Operation Barbarossa they deported about 700 Jewish residents of town to extermination camps. The Red Army arrived on 30 July 1944, and in the course of action burned down the monastery church.

On 1 January 2024, Siennica regained its civic rights.
