= Mińsk County =

Mińsk County Powiat miński
- County
- Flag Coat of arms

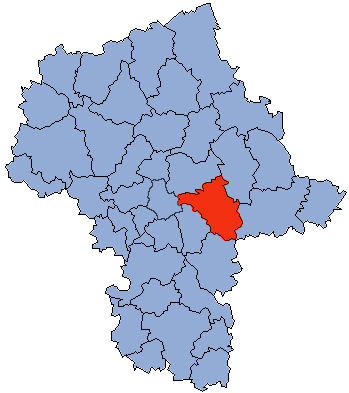
- Location within the voivodeship

- Division into gminas
- Coordinates (Mińsk Mazowiecki): 52°11′N 21°34′E
- Country: Poland
- Voivodeship: Masovian
- Seat: Mińsk Mazowiecki
- Gminas: Total 13 (incl. 2 urban): Mińsk Mazowiecki; Sulejówek; Gmina Cegłów; Gmina Dębe Wielkie; Gmina Dobre; Gmina Halinów; Gmina Jakubów; Gmina Kałuszyn; Gmina Latowicz; Gmina Mińsk Mazowiecki; Gmina Mrozy; Gmina Siennica; Gmina Stanisławów

Area
  - Total: 1,164.35 km^{2} (449.56 sq mi)

Population (2019)
  - Total: 150,480
  - Density: 129.24/km^{2} (334.73/sq mi)
  - Urban: 67,240
  - Rural: 82,638
- Car plates: WM
- Website: www.powiatminski.pl

Mińsk County (Polish: powiat miński) is a unit of territorial administration and local government (powiat) in Masovian Voivodeship, east-central Poland. It was (re)created on January 1, 1999, as a result of the Polish local government reforms passed in 1998. Its administrative seat and largest town is Mińsk Mazowiecki, which lies 39 kilometres (24 mi) east of Warsaw. The county contains three other towns: Sulejówek, 21 km (13 mi) west of Mińsk Mazowiecki, Halinów, 16 km (10 mi) west of Mińsk Mazowiecki, and Kałuszyn, 17 km (11 mi) east of Mińsk Mazowiecki.

The county covers an area of 1,164.35 square kilometres (449.6 sq mi). As of 2019 its total population is 150,480, out of which the population of Mińsk Mazowiecki is 40,836, that of Sulejówek is 19,766, that of Halinów is 3,739, that of Kałuszyn is 2,899, and the rural population is 82,638.

== Neighbouring counties ==
Mińsk County is bordered by Węgrów County to the north-east, Siedlce County to the east, Garwolin County to the south, Otwock County and the city of Warsaw to the west, and Wołomin County to the north-west.

== Administrative divisions ==
The county is subdivided into 13 gminas (two urban, two urban-rural and nine rural). These are listed in the following table, in descending order of population.

Gmina	Type	Area (km^{2})	Population (2019)	Seat
Mińsk Mazowiecki	urban	13.1	40,836	
Sulejówek	urban	19.5	19,766	
Gmina Halinów	urban-rural	63.1	16,254	Halinów
Gmina Mińsk Mazowiecki	rural	112.3	15,364	Mińsk Mazowiecki *
Gmina Dębe Wielkie	rural	77.9	10,436	Dębe Wielkie
Gmina Siennica	rural	111.0	7,499	Siennica
Gmina Stanisławów	rural	106.0	6,777	Stanisławów
Gmina Cegłów	rural	95.7	6,118	Cegłów
Gmina Dobre	rural	124.9	5,974	Dobre
Gmina Kałuszyn	urban-rural	94.5	5,846	Kałuszyn
Gmina Latowicz	rural	114.2	5,403	Latowicz
Gmina Mrozy	rural	145.2	5,123	Mrozy
Gmina Jakubów	rural	87.2	5,084	Jakubów
* seat not part of the gmina
