= Olšany =

Olšany may refer to places in the Czech Republic:

- Olšany (Jihlava District), a municipality and village in the Vysočina Region
- Olšany (Klatovy District), a municipality and village in the Plzeň Region
- Olšany (Šumperk District), a municipality and village in the Olomouc Region
- Olšany (Vyškov District), a municipality and village in the South Moravian Region
- Olšany, a village and part of Brandýsek in the Central Bohemian Region
- Olšany, a village and part of Kluky (Kutná Hora District) in the Central Bohemian Region
- Olšany, a village and part of Studená (Jindřichův Hradec District) in the Central Bohemian Region
- Olšany u Prostějova, a municipality and village in the Olomouc Region
- Olšany Cemetery in Prague
