= Adamów =

Adamów may refer to any of the following villages in Poland:

- Adamów, Łęczna County in Lublin Voivodeship (east Poland)
- Adamów, Łuków County in Lublin Voivodeship (east Poland)
- Adamów, Zamość County in Lublin Voivodeship (east Poland)
- Adamów, Chełm County in Lublin Voivodeship (east Poland)
- Adamów, Gmina Bełchatów in Łódź Voivodeship (central Poland)
- Adamów, Gmina Kleszczów in Łódź Voivodeship (central Poland)
- Adamów, Brzeziny County in Łódź Voivodeship (central Poland)
- Adamów, Kutno County in Łódź Voivodeship (central Poland)
- Adamów, Gmina Opoczno in Łódź Voivodeship (central Poland)
- Adamów, Gmina Paradyż in Łódź Voivodeship (central Poland)
- Adamów, Gmina Żarnów in Łódź Voivodeship (central Poland)
- Adamów, Gmina Łęki Szlacheckie in Łódź Voivodeship (central Poland)
- Adamów, Gmina Wolbórz in Łódź Voivodeship (central Poland)
- Adamów, Poddębice County in Łódź Voivodeship (central Poland)
- Adamów, Radomsko County in Łódź Voivodeship (central Poland)
- Adamów, Skierniewice County in Łódź Voivodeship (central Poland)
- Adamów, Gmina Budziszewice, Tomaszów County in Łódź Voivodeship (central Poland)
- Adamów, Końskie County in Świętokrzyskie Voivodeship (south-central Poland)
- Adamów, Gmina Opatów in Świętokrzyskie Voivodeship (south-central Poland)
- Adamów, Gmina Lipnik in Świętokrzyskie Voivodeship (south-central Poland)
- Adamów, Starachowice County in Świętokrzyskie Voivodeship (south-central Poland)
- Adamów, Białobrzegi County in Masovian Voivodeship (east-central Poland)
- Adamów, Gostynin County in Masovian Voivodeship (east-central Poland)
- Adamów, Gmina Grodzisk Mazowiecki in Masovian Voivodeship (east-central Poland)
- Adamów, Kozienice County in Masovian Voivodeship (east-central Poland)
- Adamów, Lipsko County in Masovian Voivodeship (east-central Poland)
- Adamów, Mińsk County in Masovian Voivodeship (east-central Poland)
- Adamów, Węgrów County in Masovian Voivodeship (east-central Poland)
- Adamów, Żyrardów County in Masovian Voivodeship (east-central Poland)
- Adamów, Gmina Golina in Greater Poland Voivodeship (west-central Poland)
- Adamów, Gmina Krzymów in Greater Poland Voivodeship (west-central Poland)
- Adamów, Gmina Kłomnice in Silesian Voivodeship (south Poland)
- Adamów, Gmina Mykanów in Silesian Voivodeship (south Poland)

== See also ==
- Gmina Adamów, Łuków County
- Gmina Adamów, Zamość County
