= Kluky =

Kluky may refer to places in the Czech Republic:

- Kluky (Kutná Hora District), a municipality and village in the Central Bohemian Region
- Kluky (Mladá Boleslav District), a municipality and village in the Central Bohemian Region
- Kluky (Písek District), a municipality and village in the South Bohemian Region

== See also ==
- Kluk (disambiguation)
