= Kobylańska =

Kobylańska may refer to:

- Wólka Kobylańska, a village in Poland
- Krystyna Kobylańska, Polish musicologist

== See also ==
- Kobylański (disambiguation)
- Olha Kobylianska (1863-1942), Ukrainian modernist writer and feminist
