= Bródki =

Bródki may refer to the following places:

- Bródki, Greater Poland Voivodeship (west-central Poland)
- Bródki, Lublin Voivodeship (east Poland)
- Bródki, Lubusz Voivodeship (west Poland)
