= Sołki =

Sołki may refer to:

- Sołki, Masovian Voivodeship, a village in east-central Poland
- Sołki, Podlaskie Voivodeship, a village in northeastern Poland
