= Kobylanka =

Kobylanka may refer to the following places:

- Kobylanka, Lesser Poland Voivodeship (south Poland)
- Kobylanka, Masovian Voivodeship (east-central Poland)
- Kobylanka, Podlaskie Voivodeship (north-east Poland)
- Kobylanka, West Pomeranian Voivodeship (north-west Poland)
