= Kluk =

Kluk may refer to:

== Family name ==
- Angelika Kluk (1983–2006), Polish college student murdered in Glasgow, Scotland
- Dino Kluk (born 1991), Croatian footballer
- Jan Krzysztof Kluk (1739–1796), Polish naturalist agronomist and entomologist

== Other ==
- Holka nebo kluk (means "A Girl or a Boy"), a Czech comedy play and operetta
- 159743 Kluk, a main-belt asteroid
- KLUK (97.9 FM), a radio station broadcasting a classic rock format in Needles, California, USA

== See also ==
- Kluky (disambiguation)
- Kluki (disambiguation) (Polish form)
- Klug (disambiguation)
