= Duchow (surname) =

Duchow is a surname. Notable people with the surname include:

- Cindi Duchow (born 1959), American retail manager, buyer, and politician
- Lawrence Duchow (1914–1972), American bandleader
- Marvin Duchow (1914–1979), Canadian composer, teacher, and musicologist

== See also ==
- Duchów
