= Rakowiec (disambiguation) =

Rakowiec may refer to the following places:

- Rakowiec, Warsaw
- Rakowiec, Kwidzyn County in Pomeranian Voivodeship (north Poland)
- Rakowiec, Tczew County in Pomeranian Voivodeship (north Poland)
- Rakowiec, Gostynin County in Masovian Voivodeship (central Poland)
- Rakowiec, Siedlce County in Masovian Voivodeship (east Poland)
- Rakówiec, Masovian Voivodeship (east-central Poland)
