= Brzozowica =

Brzozowica may refer to the following places:

- Brzozowica, Masovian Voivodeship (east-central Poland)
- Brzozowica, Otwock County in Masovian Voivodeship (east-central Poland)
- Brzozowica, West Pomeranian Voivodeship (north-west Poland)
