= Gmina Kałuszyn =

Gmina Kałuszyn Kałuszyn Commune
- Gmina
- Coat of arms
- Interactive map of Gmina Kałuszyn
- Coordinates (Kałuszyn): 52°12′30″N 21°48′42″E
- Country: Poland
- Voivodeship: Masovian
- County: Mińsk
- Seat: Kałuszyn

Area
  - Total: 94.52 km^{2} (36.49 sq mi)

Population (2013)
  - Total: 5,938
  - Density: 62.82/km^{2} (162.7/sq mi)
  - Urban: 2,934
  - Rural: 3,004

Gmina Kałuszyn is an urban-rural gmina (administrative district) in Mińsk County, Masovian Voivodeship, in east-central Poland. Its seat is the town of Kałuszyn, which lies approximately 17 kilometres (11 mi) east of Mińsk Mazowiecki and 56 km (35 mi) east of Warsaw.

The gmina covers an area of 94.52 square kilometres (36.5 sq mi), and as of 2006 its total population is 6,190 (out of which the population of Kałuszyn amounts to 2,905, and the population of the rural part of the gmina is 3,285).

== Villages ==
Apart from the town of Kałuszyn, Gmina Kałuszyn contains the villages and settlements of Abramy, Budy Przytockie, Chrościce, Falbogi, Garczyn Duży, Garczyn Mały, Gołębiówka, Kazimierzów, Kluki, Leonów, Marianka, Marysin, Milew, Mroczki, Nowe Groszki, Olszewice, Patok, Piotrowina, Przytoka, Ryczołek, Sinołęka, Stare Groszki, Szembory, Szymony, Wąsy, Wity, Wólka Kałuska, Żebrówka and Zimnowoda.

== Neighbouring gminas ==
Gmina Kałuszyn is bordered by the gminas of Cegłów, Dobre, Grębków, Jakubów, Kotuń, Mrozy and Wierzbno.
