= Patok, Masovian Voivodeship =

Patok
- Village
- Location within Poland
- Coordinates: 52°12′07″N 21°49′02″E
- Country: Poland
- Voivodeship: Masovian
- County: Mińsk
- Gmina: Kałuszyn
- Population: 162

Patok [ˈpatɔk] is a village in the administrative district of Gmina Kałuszyn, within Mińsk County, Masovian Voivodeship, in east-central Poland.
