= Osęczyzna =

- Village
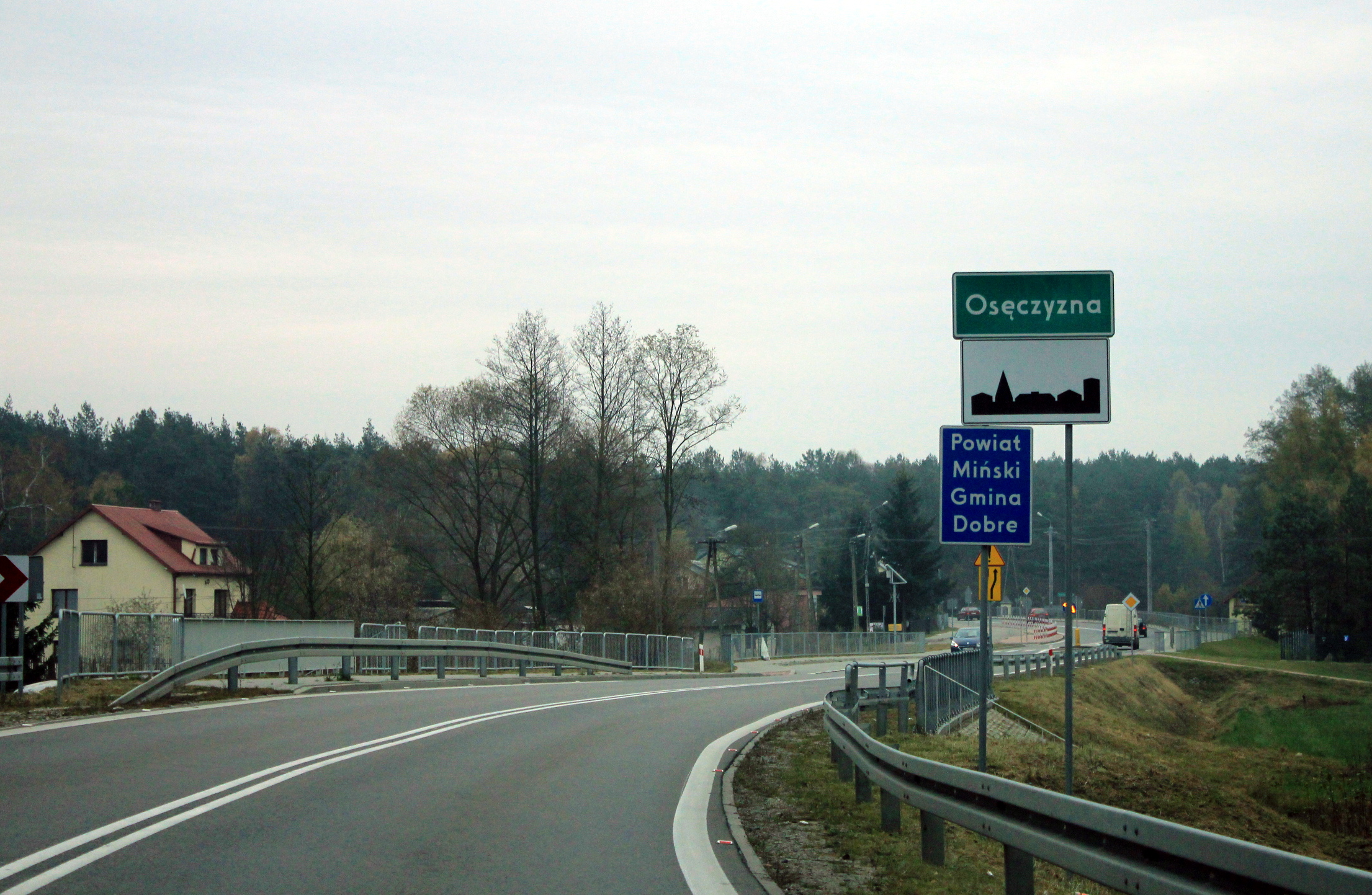

- Location within Poland
- Coordinates: 52°18′41″N 21°35′21″E
- Country: Poland
- Voivodeship: Masovian
- County: Mińsk
- Gmina: Dobre
- Population: 91

Osęczyzna [ɔsɛnˈt͡ʂɨzna] is a village in the administrative district of Gmina Dobre, within Mińsk County, Masovian Voivodeship, in east-central Poland.
