= Gmina Dobre, Masovian Voivodeship =

Gmina Dobre Dobre Commune
- Gmina
- Coat of arms
- Interactive map of Gmina Dobre
- Coordinates (Dobre): 52°19′17″N 21°40′42″E
- Country: Poland
- Voivodeship: Masovian
- County: Mińsk
- Seat: Dobre

Area
  - Total: 124.85 km^{2} (48.20 sq mi)

Population (2013)
  - Total: 6,012
  - Density: 48.15/km^{2} (124.7/sq mi)
- Website: https://www.gminadobre.pl/

Gmina Dobre is a rural gmina (administrative district) in Mińsk County, Masovian Voivodeship, in east-central Poland. Its seat is the village of Dobre, which lies approximately 18 kilometres (11 mi) north-east of Mińsk Mazowiecki and 48 km (30 mi) east of Warsaw.

The gmina covers an area of 124.85 square kilometres (48.2 sq mi), and as of 2006 its total population is 5,938 (6,012 in 2013).

== Villages ==
Gmina Dobre contains the villages and settlements of Adamów, Antonina, Brzozowica, Czarnocin, Czarnogłów, Dobre, Drop, Duchów, Gęsianka, Głęboczyca, Grabniak, Jaczewek, Joanin, Kąty-Borucza, Kobylanka, Makówiec Duży, Makówiec Mały, Marcelin, Mlęcin, Modecin, Nowa Wieś, Osęczyzna, Pokrzywnik, Poręby Nowe, Poręby Stare, Rąbierz-Kolonia, Radoszyna, Rakówiec, Ruda-Pniewnik, Rudno, Rudzienko, Rynia, Sąchocin, Sołki, Świdrów, Walentów, Wólka Czarnogłowska, Wólka Kobylańska, Wólka Kokosia and Wólka Mlęcka.

== Neighbouring gminas ==
Gmina Dobre is bordered by the gminas of Jakubów, Kałuszyn, Korytnica, Stanisławów, Strachówka and Wierzbno.
