= Bondyrz =

- Village
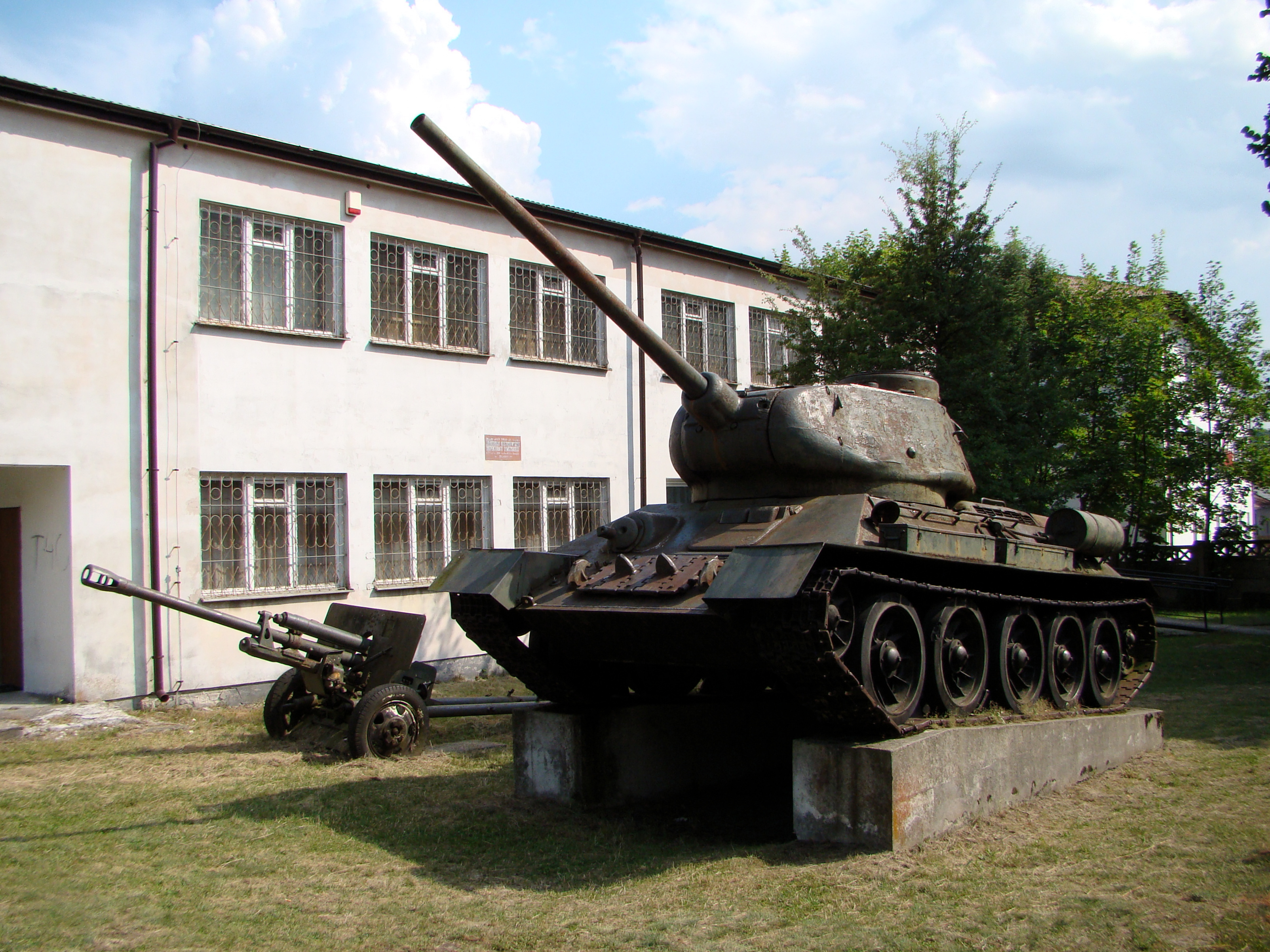
- Former World War II Museum

- Location within Poland
- Coordinates: 50°34′N 23°6′E
- Country: Poland
- Voivodeship: Lublin
- County: Zamość
- Gmina: Adamów

Population (approx.)
  - Total: 810

Bondyrz [ˈbɔndɨʂ] is a village in the administrative district of Gmina Adamów, within Zamość County, Lublin Voivodeship, in eastern Poland.

== Population ==
| Year | Residents |
|---|---|
| 2011 | 677 |
| 2021 | 558 |

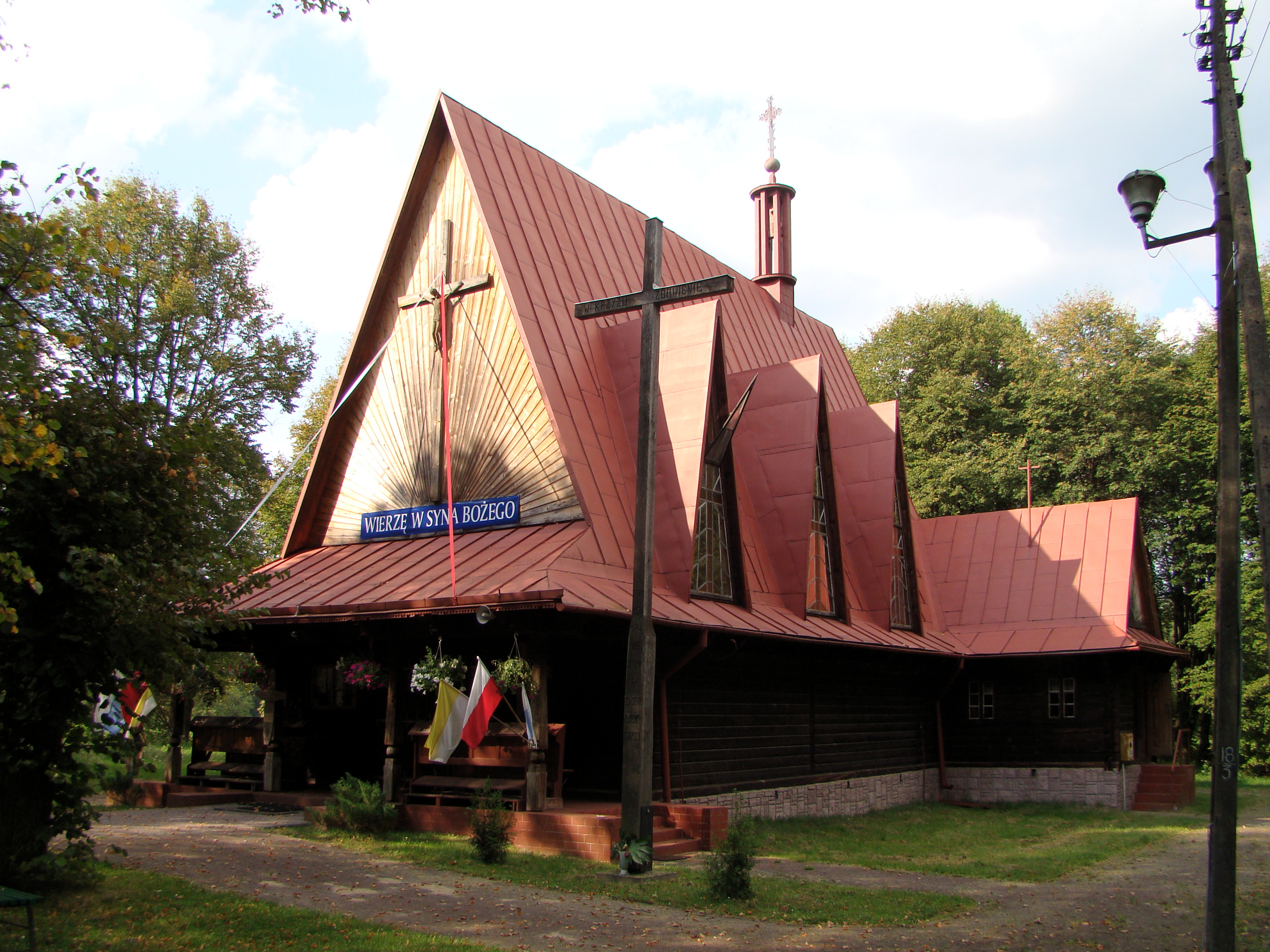
Saint Providence of God church

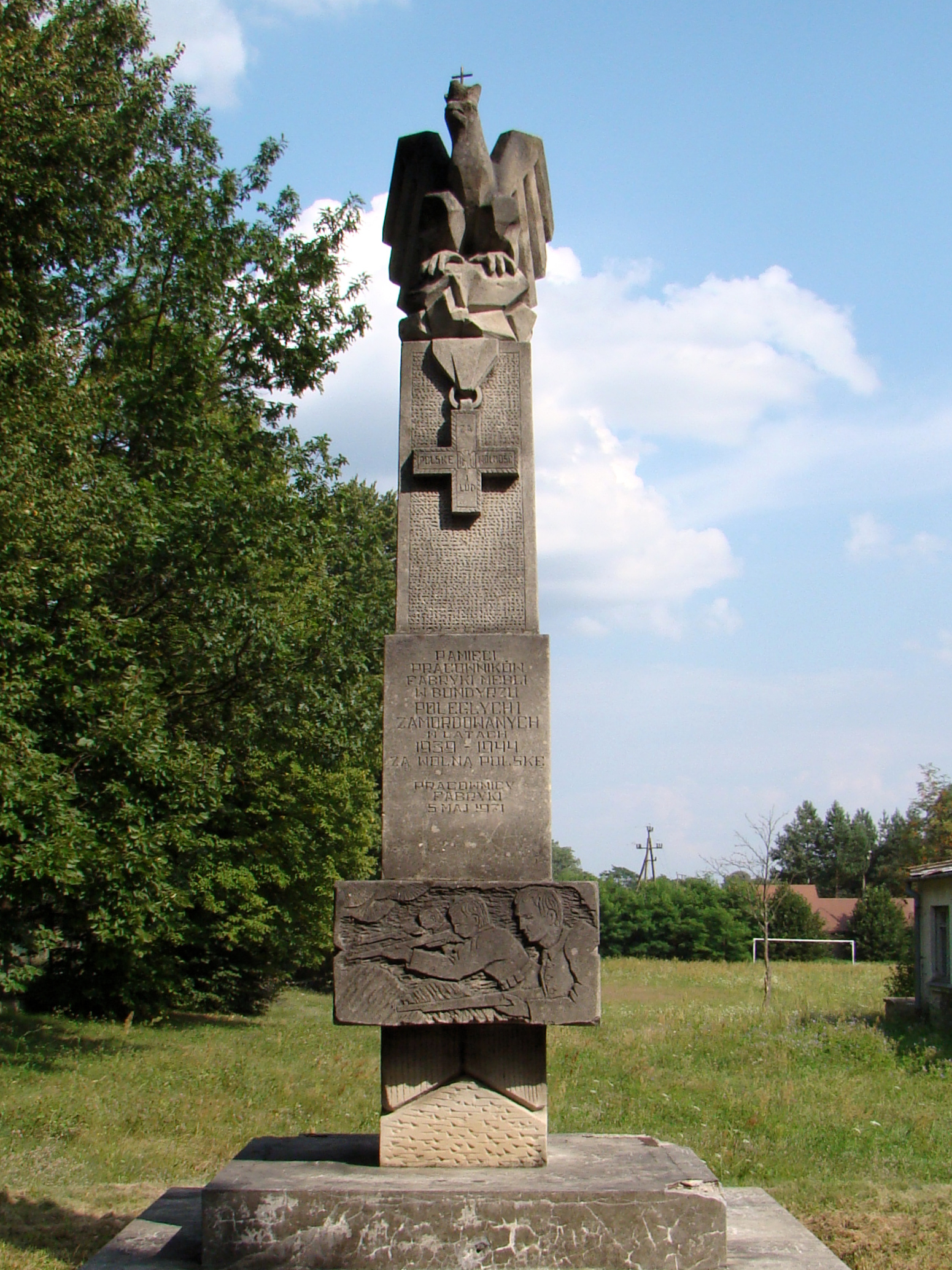
Memorial of factory workers killed during WW II
