= Antonina, Masovian Voivodeship =

Antonina
- Village
- Location within Poland
- Coordinates: 52°20′N 21°43′E
- Country: Poland
- Voivodeship: Masovian
- County: Mińsk
- Gmina: Dobre

Antonina [antɔˈnina] is a village in the administrative district of Gmina Dobre in Mińsk County, Masovian Voivodeship, east-central Poland.
