= Szewnia Górna =

- Village
- Location within Poland
- Coordinates: 50°37′21″N 23°10′54″E
- Country: Poland
- Voivodeship: Lublin
- County: Zamość
- Gmina: Adamów

Population
  - Total: 220

Szewnia Górna [ˈʂɛvɲa ˈɡurna] is a village in the administrative district of Gmina Adamów, within Zamość County, Lublin Voivodeship, in eastern Poland.
