= Trzepieciny =

- Village
- Location within Poland
- Coordinates: 50°35′N 23°8′E
- Country: Poland
- Voivodeship: Lublin
- County: Zamość
- Gmina: Adamów
- Time zone: UTC+1 (CET)
  - Summer (DST): UTC+2 (CEST)

Trzepieciny [tʂɛpjɛˈt͡ɕinɨ] is a village in the administrative district of Gmina Adamów, within Zamość County, Lublin Voivodeship, in eastern Poland.

== History ==
Seven Polish citizens were murdered by Nazi Germany in the village during World War II.
