= Rąbierz-Kolonia =

- Village
- Location within Poland
- Coordinates: 52°18′59″N 21°43′05″E
- Country: Poland
- Voivodeship: Masovian
- County: Mińsk
- Gmina: Dobre
- Population: 93

Rąbierz-Kolonia [ˈrɔmbjɛʂ kɔˈlɔɲa] is a village in the administrative district of Gmina Dobre, within Mińsk County, Masovian Voivodeship, in east-central Poland.
