= Marianka, Gmina Kałuszyn =

Marianka
- Village
- Location within Poland
- Coordinates: 52°13′26″N 21°45′46″E
- Country: Poland
- Voivodeship: Masovian
- County: Mińsk
- Gmina: Kałuszyn
- Population: 24

Marianka [maˈrjaŋka] is a village in the administrative district of Gmina Kałuszyn, within Mińsk County, Masovian Voivodeship, in east-central Poland.
