= Pokrzywnik, Masovian Voivodeship =

Pokrzywnik
- Village
- Location within Poland
- Coordinates: 52°17′56″N 21°45′15″E
- Country: Poland
- Voivodeship: Masovian
- County: Mińsk
- Gmina: Dobre
- Population: 48

Pokrzywnik [pɔˈkʂɨvnik] is a village in the administrative district of Gmina Dobre, within Mińsk County, Masovian Voivodeship, in east-central Poland.
