= Jaczewek =

- Village
- Location within Poland
- Coordinates: 52°22′56″N 21°44′03″E
- Country: Poland
- Voivodeship: Masovian
- County: Mińsk
- Gmina: Dobre
- Population: 20

Jaczewek [jaˈt͡ʂɛvɛk] is a village in the administrative district of Gmina Dobre, within Mińsk County, Masovian Voivodeship, in east-central Poland.
