= Radoszyna =

- Village
- Location within Poland
- Coordinates: 52°23′N 21°43′E
- Country: Poland
- Voivodeship: Masovian
- County: Mińsk
- Gmina: Dobre
- Area: 2.52 km^{2} (0.97 sq mi)

Radoszyna [radɔˈʂɨna] is a village in the administrative district of Gmina Dobre, within Mińsk County, Masovian Voivodeship, in east-central Poland. With a population of about 47 as of 2023.
