= Walentów, Mińsk County =

Walentów
- Village
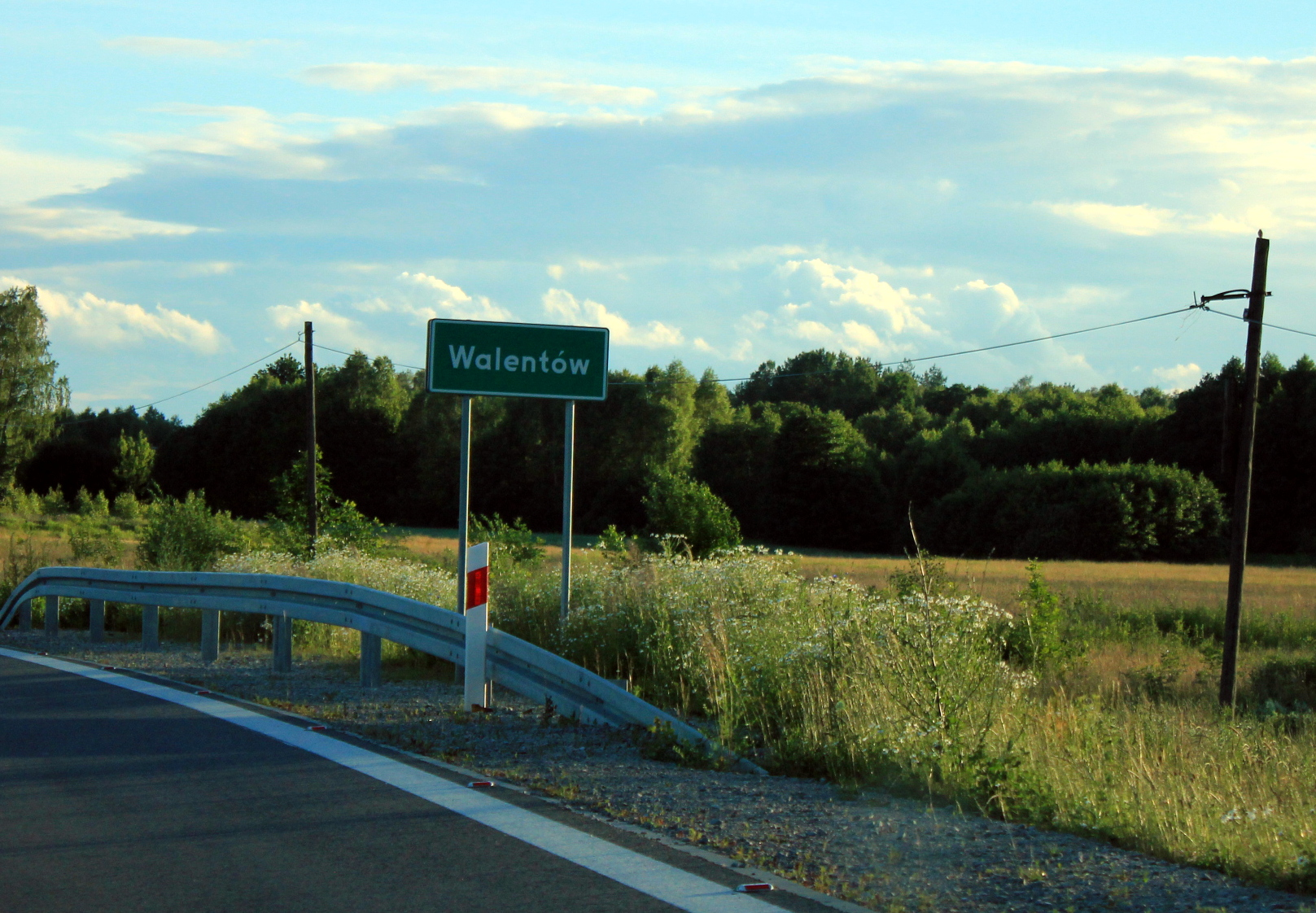

- Location within Poland
- Coordinates: 52°20′N 21°43′E
- Country: Poland
- Voivodeship: Masovian
- County: Mińsk
- Gmina: Dobre
- Population: 97

Walentów [vaˈlɛntuf] is a village in the administrative district of Gmina Dobre, within Mińsk County, Masovian Voivodeship, in east-central Poland.
