= Marysin, Mińsk County =

Marysin
- Village
- Location within Poland
- Coordinates: 52°12′35″N 21°51′43″E
- Country: Poland
- Voivodeship: Masovian
- County: Mińsk
- Gmina: Kałuszyn

Marysin [maˈrɨɕin] is a village in the administrative district of Gmina Kałuszyn, within Mińsk County, Masovian Voivodeship, in east-central Poland.
