= Olszewice, Masovian Voivodeship =

Olszewice
- Village
- Location within Poland
- Coordinates: 52°11′N 21°48′E
- Country: Poland
- Voivodeship: Masovian
- County: Mińsk
- Gmina: Kałuszyn
- Population: 185

Olszewice [ɔlʂɛˈvit͡sɛ] is a village in the administrative district of Gmina Kałuszyn, within Mińsk County, Masovian Voivodeship, in east-central Poland.
