= Wólka Czarnogłowska =

- Village
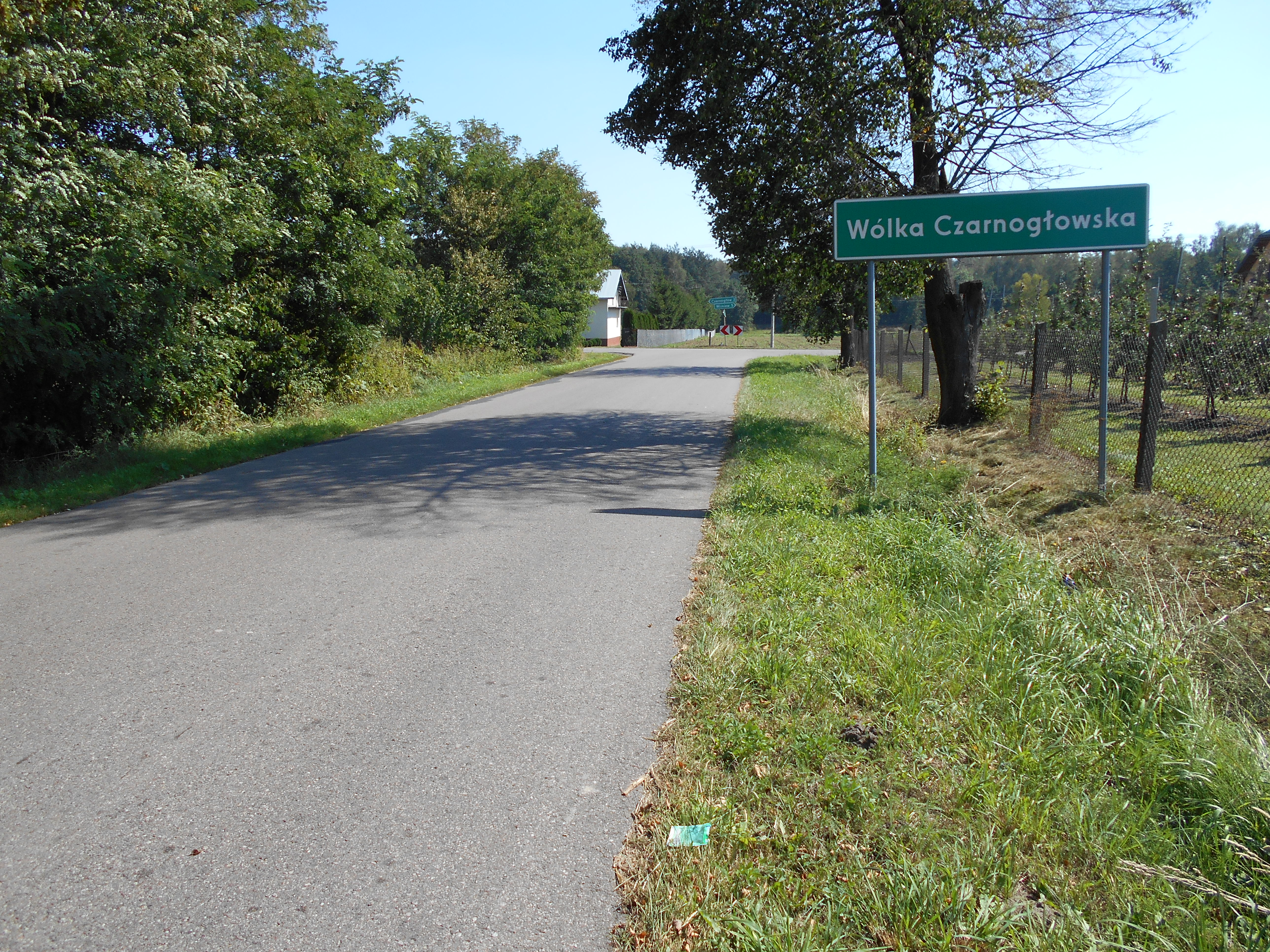
- Road sign in Wólka Czarnogłowska

- Location within Poland
- Coordinates: 52°17′45″N 21°44′01″E
- Country: Poland
- Voivodeship: Masovian
- County: Mińsk
- Gmina: Dobre
- Population: 73

Wólka Czarnogłowska [ˈvulka t͡ʂarnɔˈɡwɔfska] is a village in the administrative district of Gmina Dobre, within Mińsk County, Masovian Voivodeship, in east-central Poland.
