= Mroczki, Mińsk County =

Mroczki
- Village
- Location within Poland
- Coordinates: 52°14′N 21°50′E
- Country: Poland
- Voivodeship: Masovian
- County: Mińsk
- Gmina: Kałuszyn
- Population: 129

Mroczki (Polish pronunciation: [ˈmrɔt͡ʂkʲi]) is a village in the administrative district of Gmina Kałuszyn, within Mińsk County, Masovian Voivodeship, in east-central Poland.
