= Bliżów =

- Village
- Location within Poland
- Coordinates: 50°36′6″N 23°7′17″E
- Country: Poland
- Voivodeship: Lublin
- County: Zamość
- Gmina: Adamów

Population
  - Total: 220
- Time zone: UTC+1 (CET)
  - Summer (DST): UTC+2 (CEST)
- Vehicle registration: LZA

Bliżów [ˈbliʐuf] is a village in the administrative district of Gmina Adamów, within Zamość County, Lublin Voivodeship, in south-eastern Poland.

On 30 December 1942, Wojda (now part of Bliżów) was the site of a victorious battle of Polish partisans of the Peasant Battalions and Soviet partisans against the German gendarmerie and colonists settled as part of the Lebensraum policy.
