= Szembory =

- Village
- Location within Poland
- Coordinates: 52°16′N 21°48′E
- Country: Poland
- Voivodeship: Masovian
- County: Mińsk
- Gmina: Kałuszyn
- Population: 37

Szembory [ʂɛmˈbɔrɨ] is a village in the administrative district of Gmina Kałuszyn, within Mińsk County, Masovian Voivodeship, in east-central Poland.
