= Świdrów =

- Village
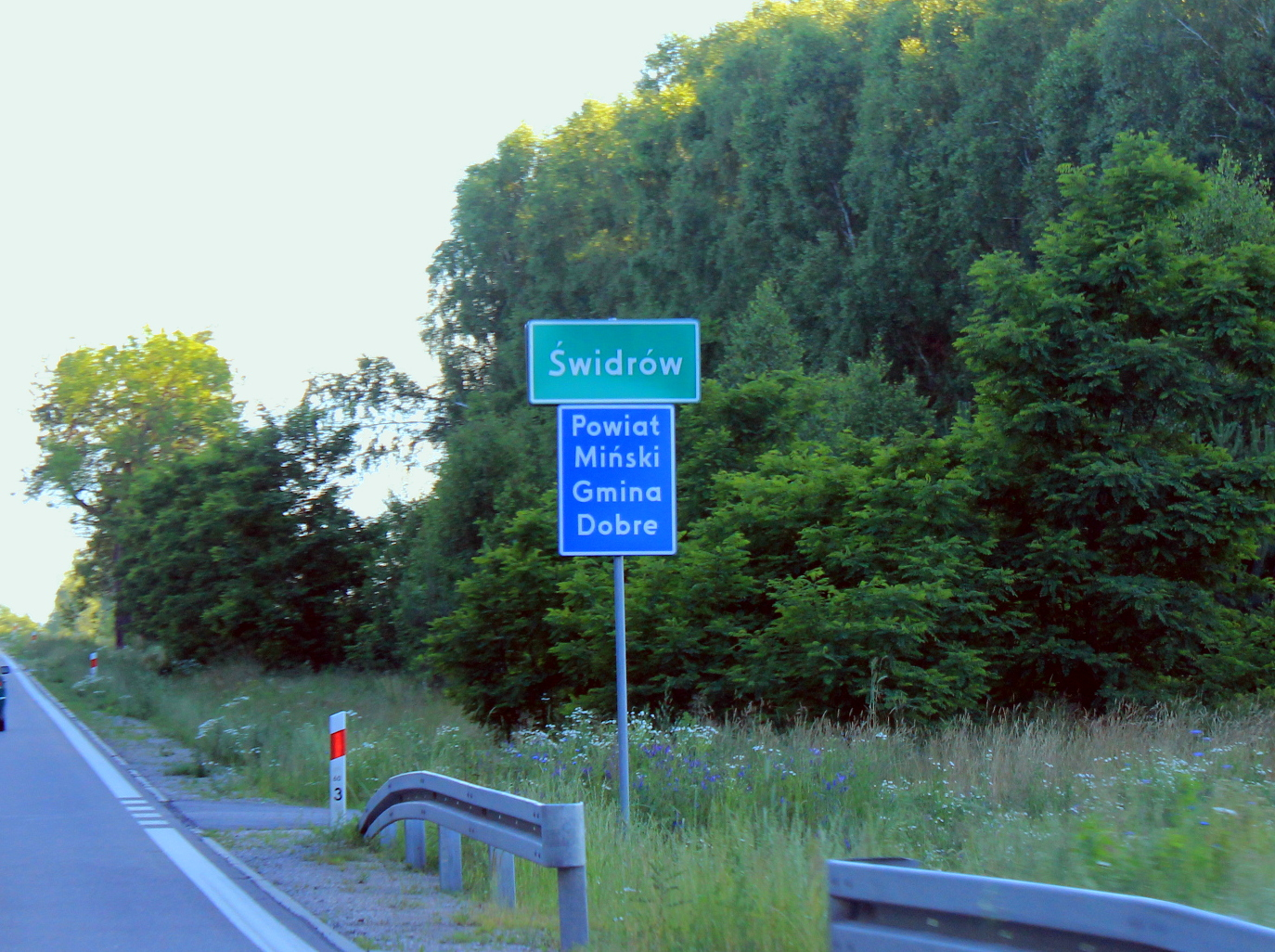

- Location within Poland
- Coordinates: 52°22′N 21°45′E
- Country: Poland
- Voivodeship: Masovian
- County: Mińsk
- Gmina: Dobre
- Population: 38

Świdrów [ˈɕfidruf] is a village in the administrative district of Gmina Dobre, within Mińsk County, Masovian Voivodeship, in east-central Poland.
