= Kąty-Borucza =

- Village
- Location within Poland
- Coordinates: 52°20′27″N 21°35′41″E
- Country: Poland
- Voivodeship: Masovian
- County: Mińsk
- Gmina: Dobre
- Population: 170

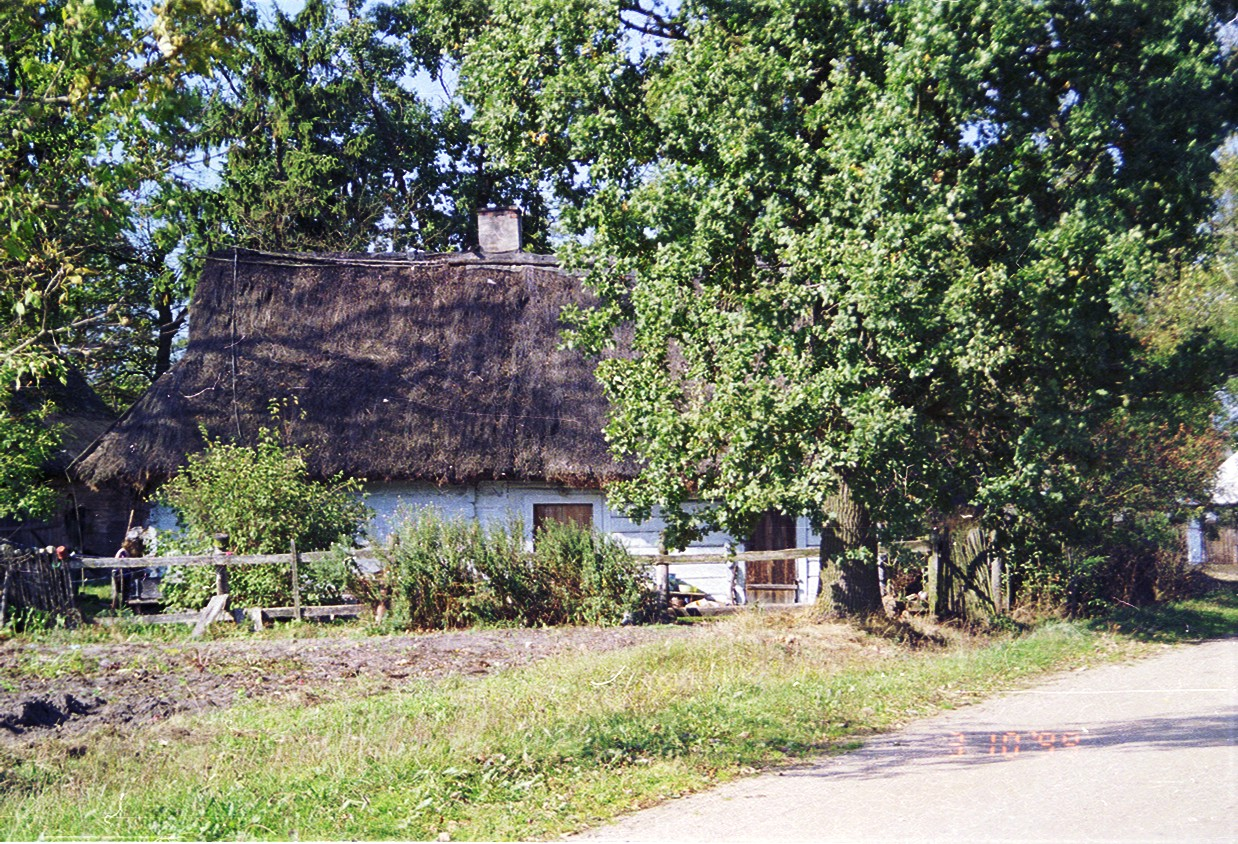
typical house from Katy-Borucza (Poland) village

Kąty-Borucza [ˈkɔntɨ bɔˈrut͡ʂa] is a village in the administrative district of Gmina Dobre, within Mińsk County, Masovian Voivodeship, in east-central Poland.
