= Makówiec Mały =

- Village
- Location within Poland
- Coordinates: 52°20′14″N 21°45′0″E
- Country: Poland
- Voivodeship: Masovian
- County: Mińsk
- Gmina: Dobre
- Population: 81

Makówiec Mały [maˈkuvjɛt͡s ˈmawɨ] is a village in the administrative district of Gmina Dobre, within Mińsk County, Masovian Voivodeship, in east-central Poland.
