= Chrościce, Mińsk County =

Village in Gmina Kałuszyn, Poland

Chrościce
- Village
- Location within Poland
- Coordinates: 52°14′29″N 21°47′07″E
- Country: Poland
- Voivodeship: Masovian
- County: Mińsk
- Gmina: Kałuszyn
- Population (approx.): 100

Chrościce [xrɔɕˈt͡ɕit͡sɛ] is a village in the administrative district of Gmina Kałuszyn, within Mińsk County, Masovian Voivodeship, in east-central Poland.
