= Grabniak, Mińsk County =

Grabniak
- Village
- Location within Poland
- Coordinates: 52°18′7″N 21°38′53″E
- Country: Poland
- Voivodeship: Masovian
- County: Mińsk
- Gmina: Dobre
- Population: 75

Grabniak [ˈɡrabɲak] is a village in the administrative district of Gmina Dobre, within Mińsk County, Masovian Voivodeship, in east-central Poland.
