= Rudzienko, Mińsk County =

Rudzienko
- Village
- Location within Poland
- Coordinates: 52°18′N 21°40′E
- Country: Poland
- Voivodeship: Masovian
- County: Mińsk
- Gmina: Dobre
- Population: 670

Rudzienko [ruˈd͡ʑɛŋkɔ] is a village in the administrative district of Gmina Dobre, within Mińsk County, Masovian Voivodeship, in east-central Poland.
