= Ruda-Pniewnik =

- Village
- Location within Poland
- Coordinates: 52°22′53″N 21°41′14″E
- Country: Poland
- Voivodeship: Masovian
- County: Mińsk
- Gmina: Dobre
- Population: 66

Ruda-Pniewnik [ˈruda ˈpɲɛvnik] is a village in the administrative district of Gmina Dobre, within Mińsk County, Masovian Voivodeship, in east-central Poland.
