= Suchowola-Kolonia =

- Village
- Location within Poland
- Coordinates: 50°35′35″N 23°16′38″E
- Country: Poland
- Voivodeship: Lublin
- County: Zamość
- Gmina: Adamów

Population
  - Total: 490

Suchowola-Kolonia [suxɔˈvɔla kɔˈlɔɲa] is a village in the administrative district of Gmina Adamów, within Zamość County, Lublin Voivodeship, in eastern Poland.
