= Wąsy, Masovian Voivodeship =

Wąsy
- Village
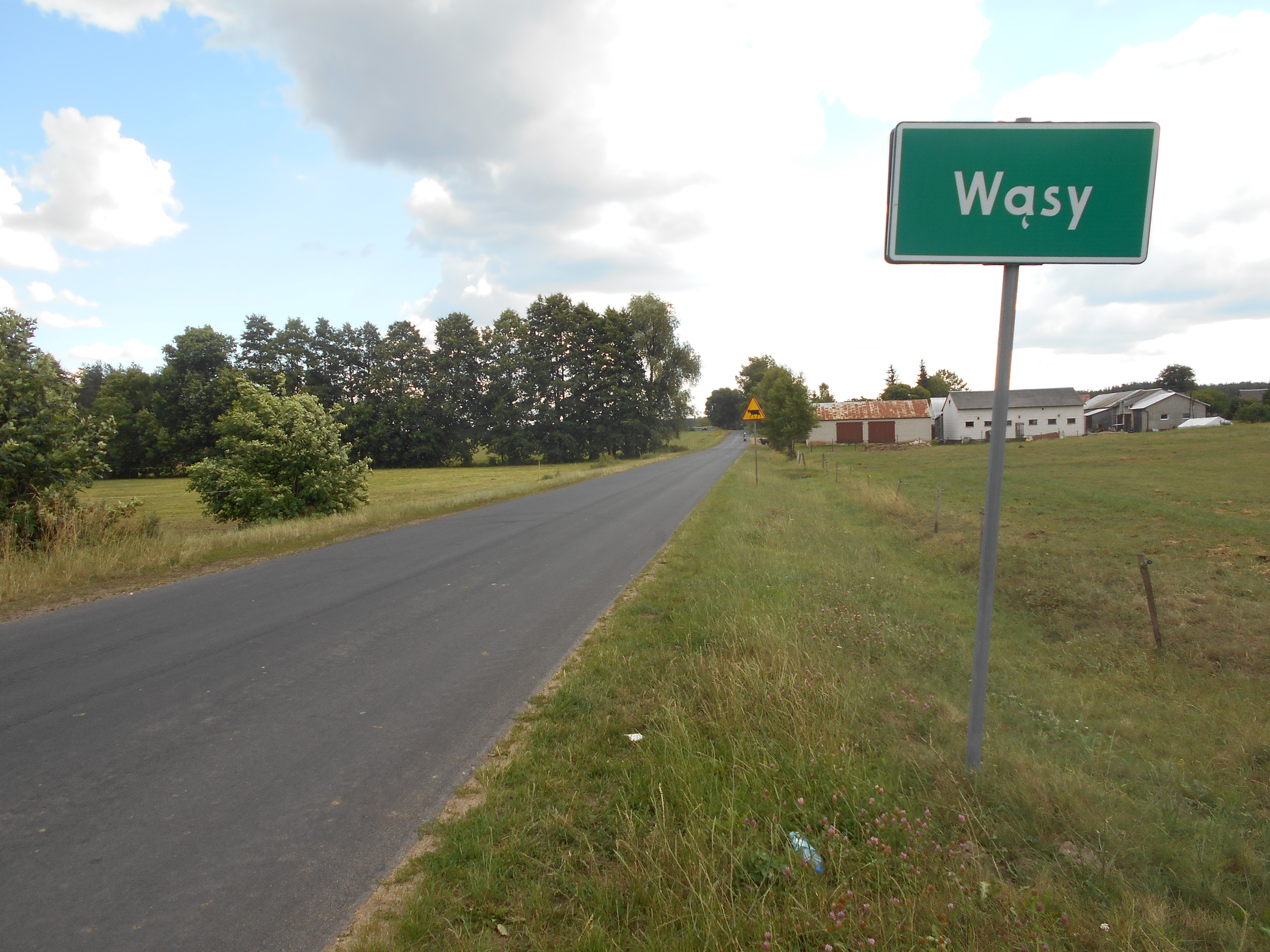

- Location within Poland
- Coordinates: 52°14′N 21°49′E
- Country: Poland
- Voivodeship: Masovian
- County: Mińsk
- Gmina: Kałuszyn
- Population: 107

Wąsy [ˈvɔ̃sɨ] is a village in the administrative district of Gmina Kałuszyn, within Mińsk County, Masovian Voivodeship, in east-central Poland.
