= Kobylański =

Kobylański may refer to:

== Places ==
- Majdan Kobylański, a village in the Lublin Voivodeship, Poland

== People ==
- Andrzej Kobylański (born 1970), Polish footballer
- Jakub Kobylański (died 1454), Polish knight
- Jan Kobylański (born 1923), Polish-Paraguayan businessman
- Martin Kobylański (born 1994), German-Polish footballer

== See also ==
- Kobylańska (disambiguation)
