= Gęsianka =

- Village
- Location within Poland
- Coordinates: 52°17′N 21°37′E
- Country: Poland
- Voivodeship: Masovian
- County: Mińsk
- Gmina: Dobre
- Population: 42

Gęsianka [ɡɛ̃ˈɕanka] is a village in the administrative district of Gmina Dobre, within Mińsk County, Masovian Voivodeship, in east-central Poland.
