= Garczyn Duży =

- Village
- Location within Poland
- Coordinates: 52°16′21″N 21°46′37″E
- Country: Poland
- Voivodeship: Masovian
- County: Mińsk
- Gmina: Kałuszyn
- Population: 100

Garczyn Duży [ˈɡart͡ʂɨn ˈduʐɨ] is a village in the administrative district of Gmina Kałuszyn, within Mińsk County, Masovian Voivodeship, in east-central Poland.
