= Szymony =

- Village
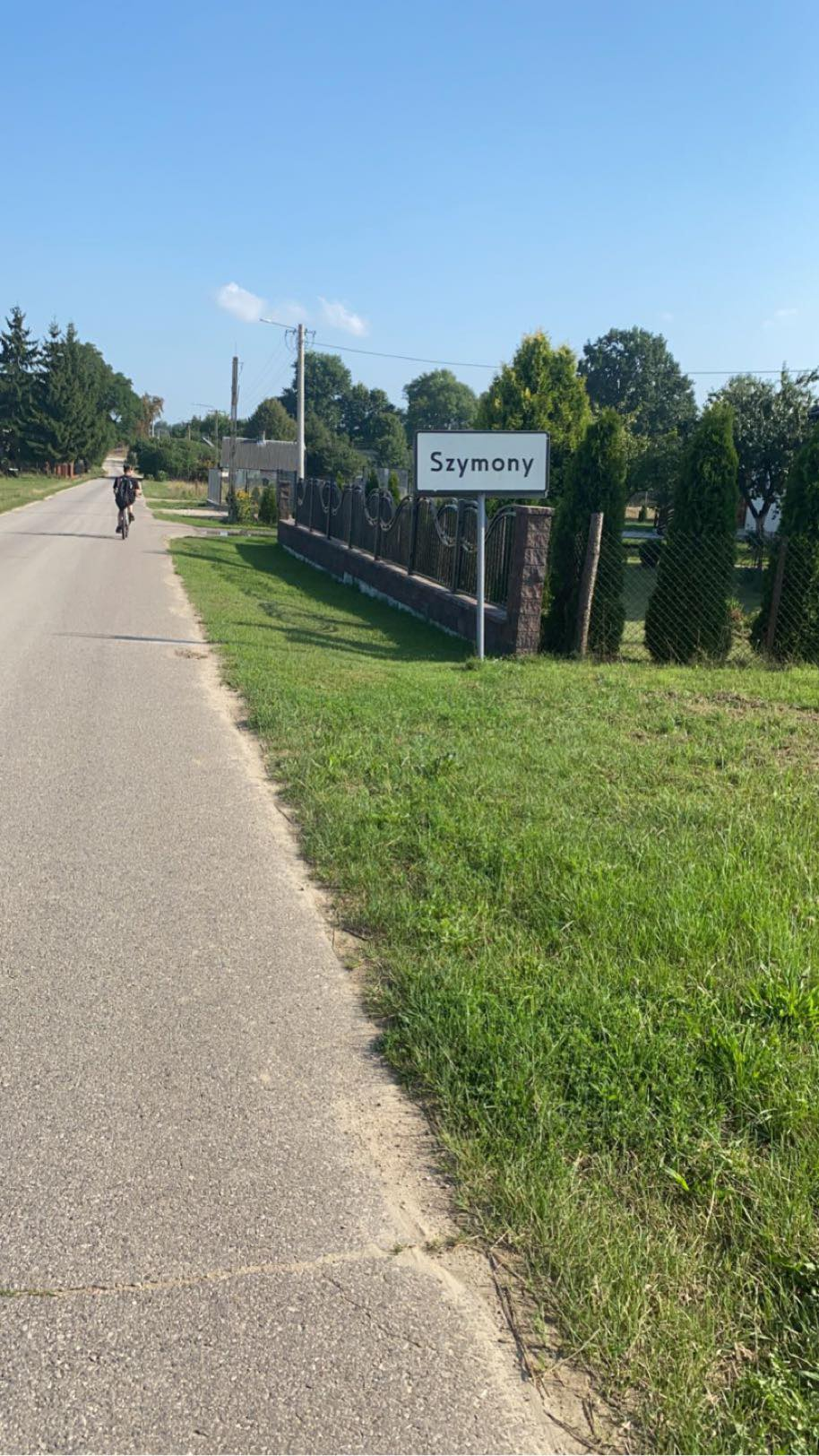

- Location within Poland
- Coordinates: 52°11′N 21°50′E
- Country: Poland
- Voivodeship: Masovian
- County: Mińsk
- Gmina: Kałuszyn
- Population: 47

Szymony (Polish pronunciation: [ʂɨˈmɔnɨ]) is a village in the administrative district of Gmina Kałuszyn, within Mińsk County, Masovian Voivodeship, in east-central Poland.
