= Kazimierzów, Mińsk County =

Kazimierzów
- Village
- Location within Poland
- Coordinates: 52°12′48″N 21°46′38″E
- Country: Poland
- Voivodeship: Masovian
- County: Mińsk
- Gmina: Kałuszyn
- Population: 34

Kazimierzów [kaʑiˈmjɛʐuf] is a village in the administrative district of Gmina Kałuszyn, within Mińsk County, Masovian Voivodeship, in east-central Poland.
