= Poręby Stare =

- Village
- Location within Poland
- Coordinates: 52°19′22″N 21°36′39″E
- Country: Poland
- Voivodeship: Masovian
- County: Mińsk
- Gmina: Dobre
- Population: 87

Poręby Stare [pɔˈrɛmbɨ ˈstarɛ] is a village in the administrative district of Gmina Dobre, within Mińsk County, Masovian Voivodeship, in east-central Poland.
