= Szewnia Dolna =

- Village
- Location within Poland
- Coordinates: 50°37′31″N 23°9′0″E
- Country: Poland
- Voivodeship: Lublin
- County: Zamość
- Gmina: Adamów

Population
  - Total: 440

Szewnia Dolna [ˈʂɛvɲa ˈdɔlna] is a village in the administrative district of Gmina Adamów, within Zamość County, Lublin Voivodeship, in eastern Poland.
