= Rudno, Mińsk County =

Rudno
- Village
- Location within Poland
- Coordinates: 52°18′3″N 21°42′35″E
- Country: Poland
- Voivodeship: Masovian
- County: Mińsk
- Gmina: Dobre
- Population: 100

Rudno [ˈrudnɔ] is a village in the administrative district of Gmina Dobre, within Mińsk County, Masovian Voivodeship, in east-central Poland.
