= Malinówka, Zamość County =

Malinówka
- Village
- Location within Poland
- Coordinates: 50°34′44″N 23°17′24″E
- Country: Poland
- Voivodeship: Lublin
- County: Zamość
- Gmina: Adamów

Malinówka [maliˈnufka] is a village in the administrative district of Gmina Adamów, within Zamość County, Lublin Voivodeship, in eastern Poland.
