= Stare Groszki =

- Village
- Location within Poland
- Coordinates: 52°12′09″N 21°54′23″E
- Country: Poland
- Voivodeship: Masovian
- County: Mińsk
- Gmina: Kałuszyn
- Population: 110

Stare Groszki [ˈstarɛ ˈɡrɔʂki] is a village in the administrative district of Gmina Kałuszyn, within Mińsk County, Masovian Voivodeship, in east-central Poland.
