= Marcelin, Masovian Voivodeship =

Marcelin
- Village
- Location within Poland
- Coordinates: 52°21′N 21°48′E
- Country: Poland
- Voivodeship: Masovian
- County: Mińsk
- Gmina: Dobre
- Population: 16

Marcelin [marˈt͡sɛlin] is a village in the administrative district of Gmina Dobre, within Mińsk County, Masovian Voivodeship, in east-central Poland.
