= Piotrowina =

- Village
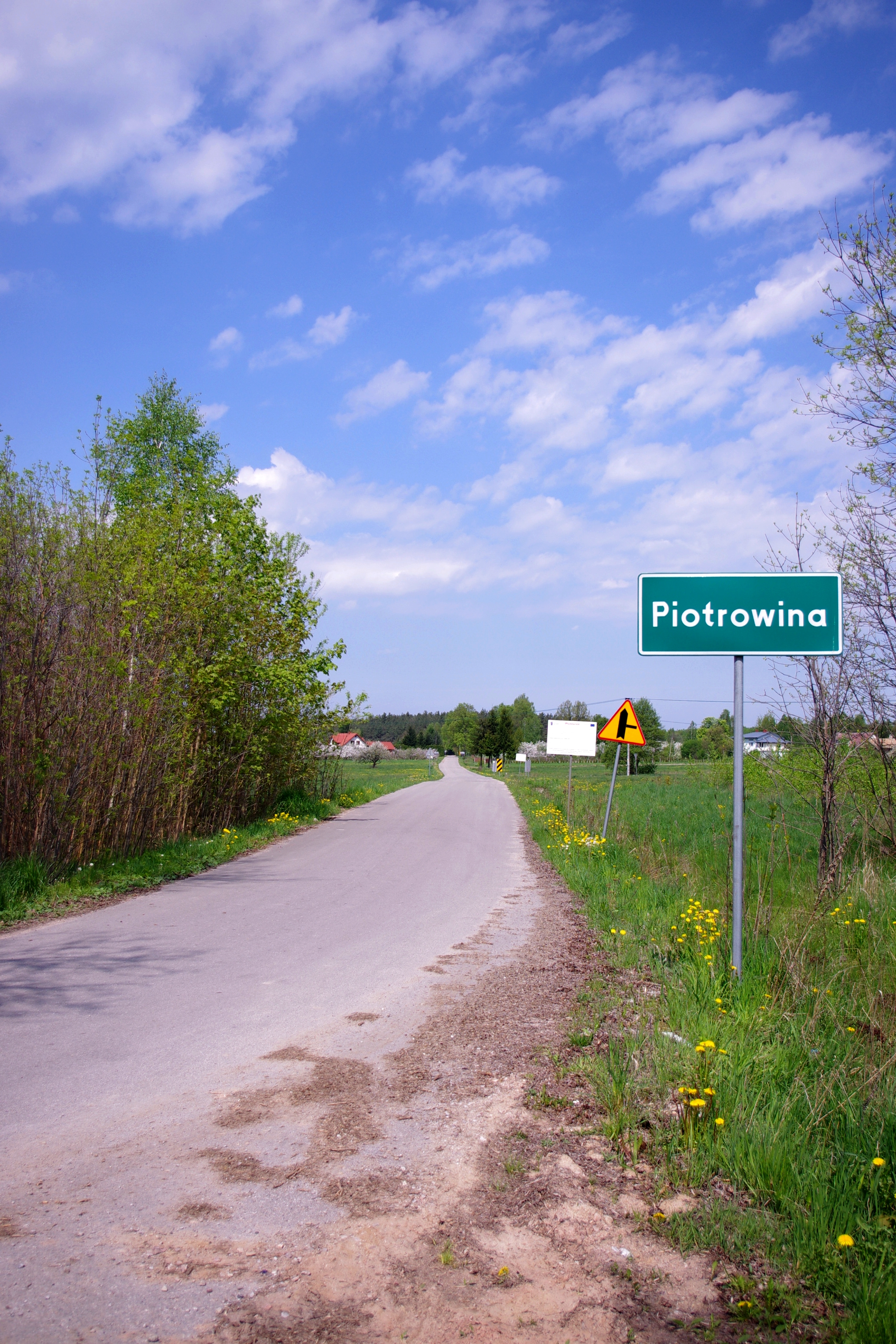
- Road sign in Piotrowina

- Location within Poland
- Coordinates: 52°12′34″N 21°56′15″E
- Country: Poland
- Voivodeship: Masovian
- County: Mińsk
- Gmina: Kałuszyn
- Population: 83

Piotrowina [pjɔtrɔˈvina] is a village in the administrative district of Gmina Kałuszyn, within Mińsk County, Masovian Voivodeship, in east-central Poland.
