= Drop, Masovian Voivodeship =

Drop
- Village
- Location within Poland
- Coordinates: 52°21′22″N 21°43′24″E
- Country: Poland
- Voivodeship: Masovian
- County: Mińsk
- Gmina: Dobre
- Population: 56

Drop [drɔp] is a village in the administrative district of Gmina Dobre, within Mińsk County, Masovian Voivodeship, in east-central Poland.
