= Joanin, Masovian Voivodeship =

Joanin
- Village
- Location within Poland
- Coordinates: 52°21′50″N 21°42′26″E
- Country: Poland
- Voivodeship: Masovian
- County: Mińsk
- Gmina: Dobre
- Population: 36

Joanin [jɔˈanin] is a village located in the administrative district of Gmina Dobre, within Mińsk County, Masovian Voivodeship, in east-central Poland.
