= Wólka Kokosia =

- Village
- Location within Poland
- Coordinates: 52°20′N 21°39′E
- Country: Poland
- Voivodeship: Masovian
- County: Mińsk
- Gmina: Dobre
- Population: 258

Wólka Kokosia [ˈvulka kɔˈkɔɕa] is a village in the administrative district of Gmina Dobre, within Mińsk County, Masovian Voivodeship, in east-central Poland.
