= Kluki =

Kluki may refer to the following places:

- Kluki, Łódź Voivodeship (central Poland)
- Kluki, Gmina Kałuszyn in Masovian Voivodeship (east-central Poland)
- Kluki, Gmina Mińsk Mazowiecki in Masovian Voivodeship (east-central Poland)
- Kluki, Pomeranian Voivodeship (north Poland)
- Kluki, West Pomeranian Voivodeship (north-west Poland)
