= Dobre, Masovian Voivodeship =

Dobre
- Town
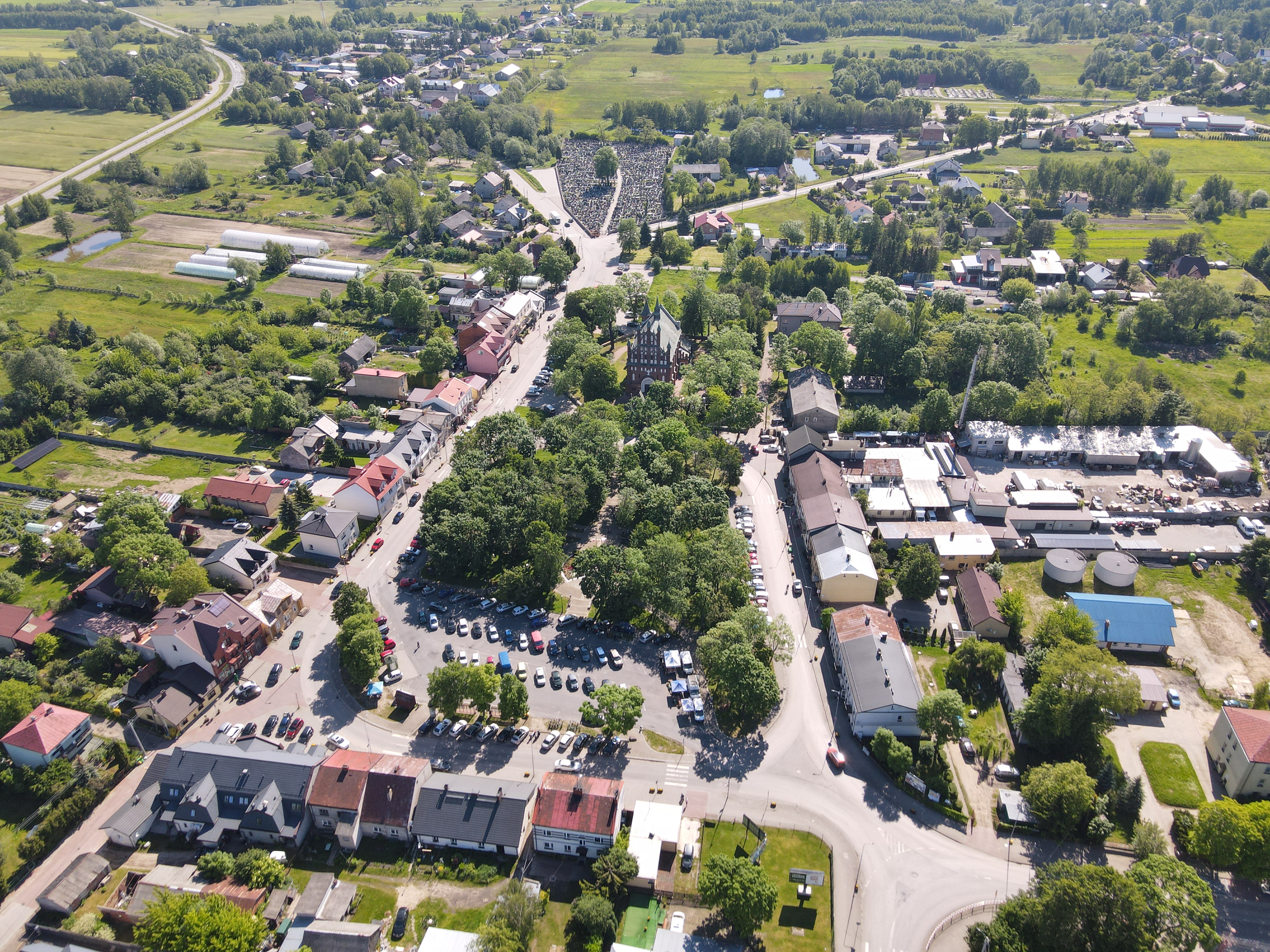
- Aerial view of Dobre

- Coat of arms

- Location within Poland
- Coordinates: 52°19′17″N 21°40′42″E
- Country: Poland
- Voivodeship: Masovian
- County: Mińsk
- Gmina: Dobre
- Town rights: 1530

Population
  - Total: 1,627
- Time zone: UTC+1 (CET)
  - Summer (DST): UTC+2 (CEST)
- Vehicle registration: WM

Dobre [ˈdɔbrɛ] is a town in Mińsk County, Masovian Voivodeship, in east-central Poland. It is the seat of the gmina (administrative district) called Gmina Dobre.

== History ==
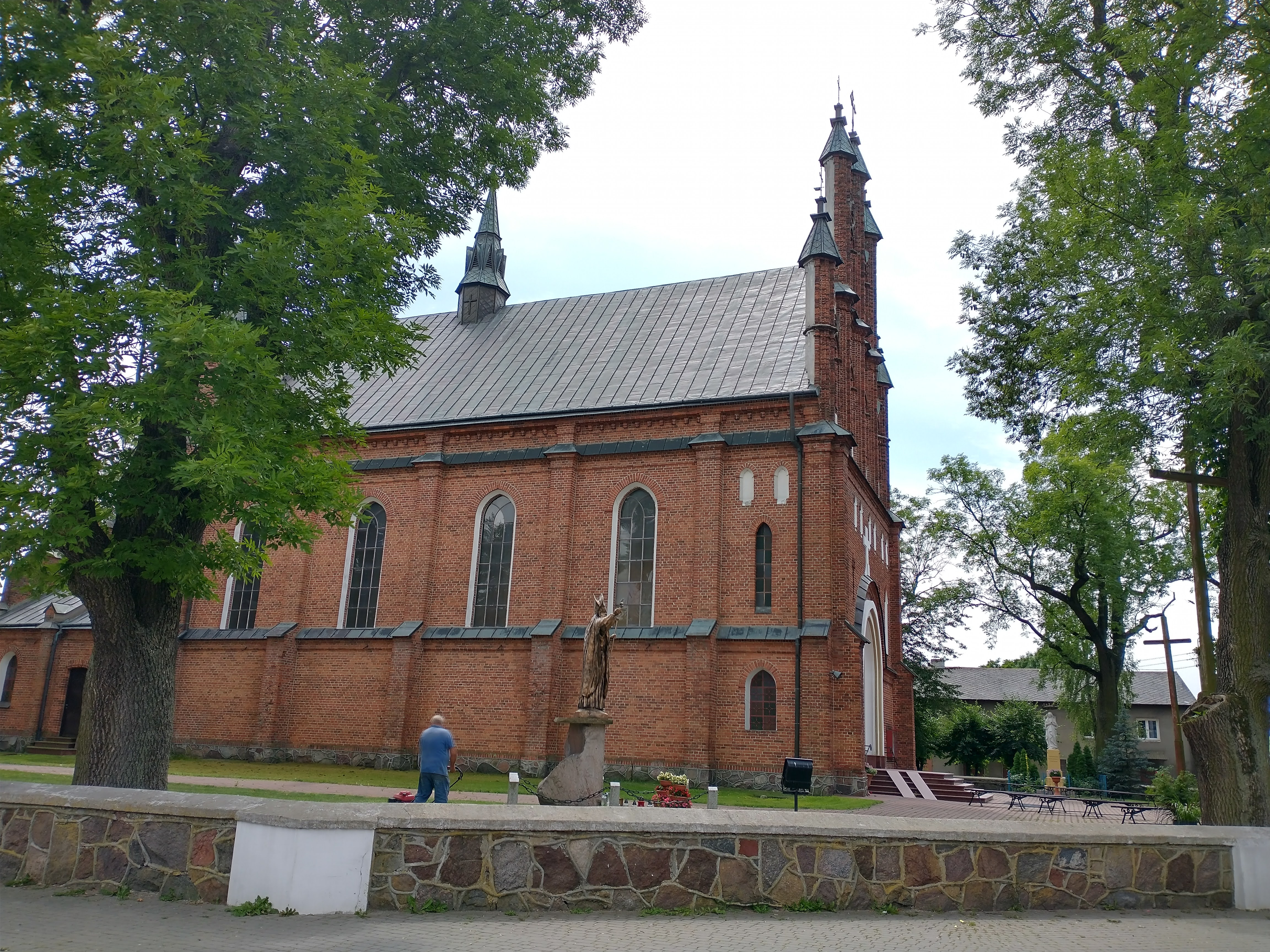
Saint Nicholas church

Dobre was the ancestral seat of the Dobrzyniecki noble family. Jan Dobrzyniecki, podstoli of Zakroczym, obtained town rights for Dobre from King Sigismund I the Old. Town rights were granted in 1530. It was a private town of the Dobrzyniecki, and later also Massalski and Szydłowski families, administratively located in the Liw Land in the Masovian Voivodeship in the Greater Poland Province of the Kingdom of Poland.

Following the joint German-Soviet invasion of Poland, which started World War II in September 1939, Dobre was occupied by Germany until 1944.

== Transport ==
Dobre lies on vovoideship road 637 which connects it to Stanisławów to the west and to Węgrów to the east.

The nearest railway station is in Mińsk Mazowiecki to the south.
