= Feliksówka =

- Village
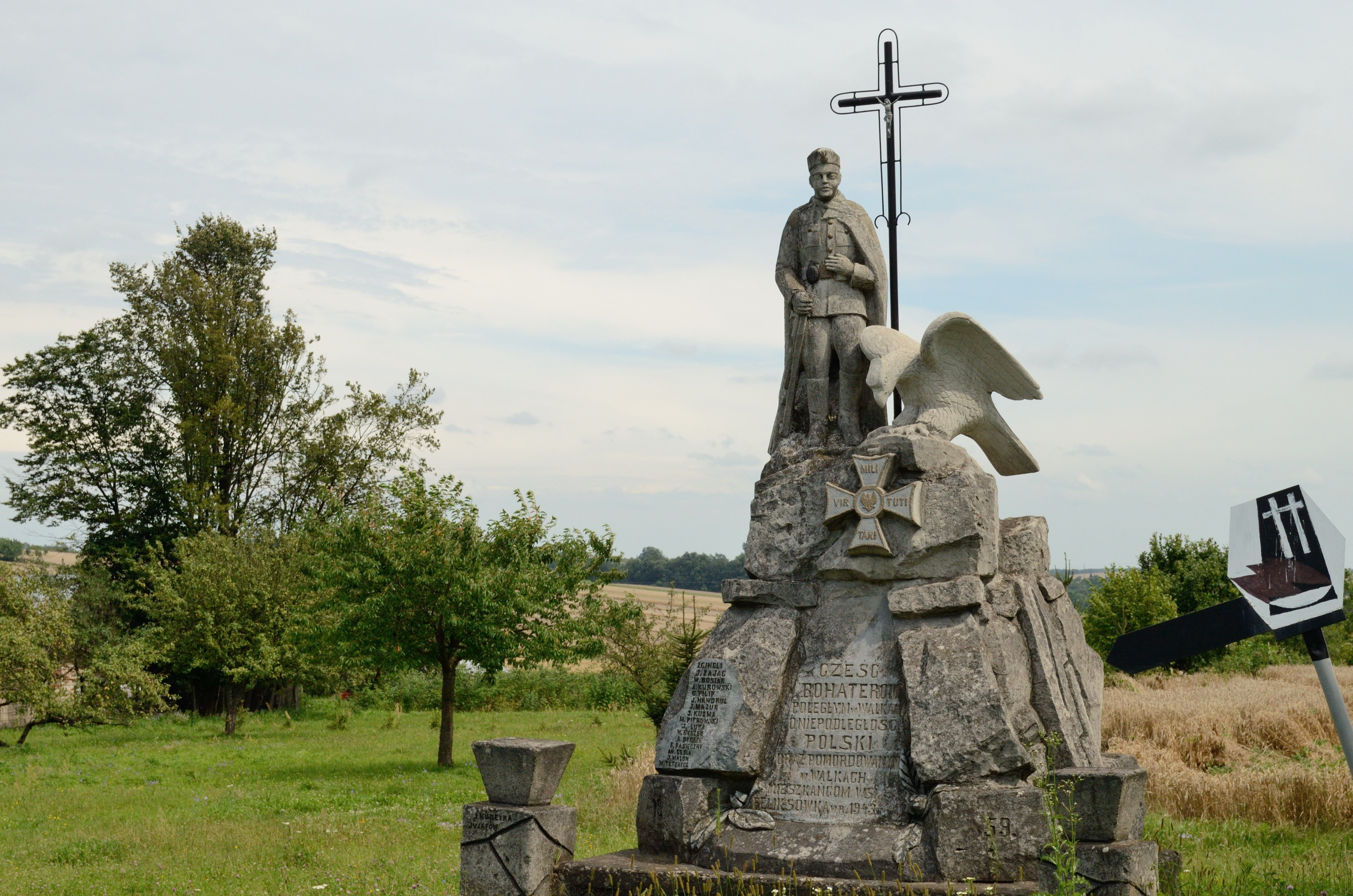

- Location within Poland
- Coordinates: 50°37′N 23°15′E
- Country: Poland
- Voivodeship: Lublin
- County: Zamość
- Gmina: Adamów
- Time zone: UTC+1 (CET)
  - Summer (DST): UTC+2 (CEST)

Feliksówka (Polish pronunciation: [fɛlikˈsufka]) is a village in the administrative district of Gmina Adamów, within Zamość County, Lublin Voivodeship, in eastern Poland.

== History ==
Eight Polish citizens were murdered by Nazi Germany in the village during World War II.
