= Boża Wola, Zamość County =

Boża Wola
- Village
- Location within Poland
- Coordinates: 50°36′40″N 23°17′53″E
- Country: Poland
- Voivodeship: Lublin
- County: Zamość
- Gmina: Adamów

Population
  - Total: 320

Boża Wola [ˈbɔʐa ˈvɔla] is a village in the administrative district of Gmina Adamów, within Zamość County, Lublin Voivodeship, in eastern Poland.
