= Grabnik, Gmina Adamów =

Grabnik
- Village
- Location within Poland
- Coordinates: 50°34′17″N 23°13′51″E
- Country: Poland
- Voivodeship: Lublin
- County: Zamość
- Gmina: Adamów

Grabnik [ˈɡrabnik] is a village in the administrative district of Gmina Adamów, within Zamość County, Lublin Voivodeship, in eastern Poland.
