= Potoczek, Zamość County =

Potoczek
- Village
- Location within Poland
- Coordinates: 50°35′26″N 23°11′22″E
- Country: Poland
- Voivodeship: Lublin
- County: Zamość
- Gmina: Adamów

Population
  - Total: 270

Potoczek [pɔˈtɔt͡ʂɛk] is a village in the administrative district of Gmina Adamów, within Zamość County, Lublin Voivodeship, in eastern Poland.
