= Nowa Wieś, Mińsk County =

Nowa Wieś
- Village
- Location within Poland
- Coordinates: 52°21′N 21°47′E
- Country: Poland
- Voivodeship: Masovian
- County: Mińsk
- Gmina: Dobre
- Population: 45

Nowa Wieś [ˈnɔva ˈvjɛɕ] is a village in the administrative district of Gmina Dobre, within Mińsk County, Masovian Voivodeship, in east-central Poland.
