= Czarnocin, Mińsk County =

Czarnocin
- Village
- Location within Poland
- Coordinates: 52°22′N 21°41′E
- Country: Poland
- Voivodeship: Masovian
- County: Mińsk
- Gmina: Dobre

Population
  - Total: 71
- Postal code: 05-307

Czarnocin [t͡ʂarˈnɔt͡ɕin] is a village in the administrative district of Gmina Dobre, within Mińsk County, Masovian Voivodeship, in east-central Poland.
