= Bródki, Lublin Voivodeship =

Bródki
- Village
- Location within Poland
- Coordinates: 50°34′43″N 23°11′50″E
- Country: Poland
- Voivodeship: Lublin
- County: Zamość
- Gmina: Adamów

Bródki [ˈbrutki] is a village in the administrative district of Gmina Adamów, within Zamość County, Lublin Voivodeship, in eastern Poland.
