= Sołki, Masovian Voivodeship =

Sołki
- Village
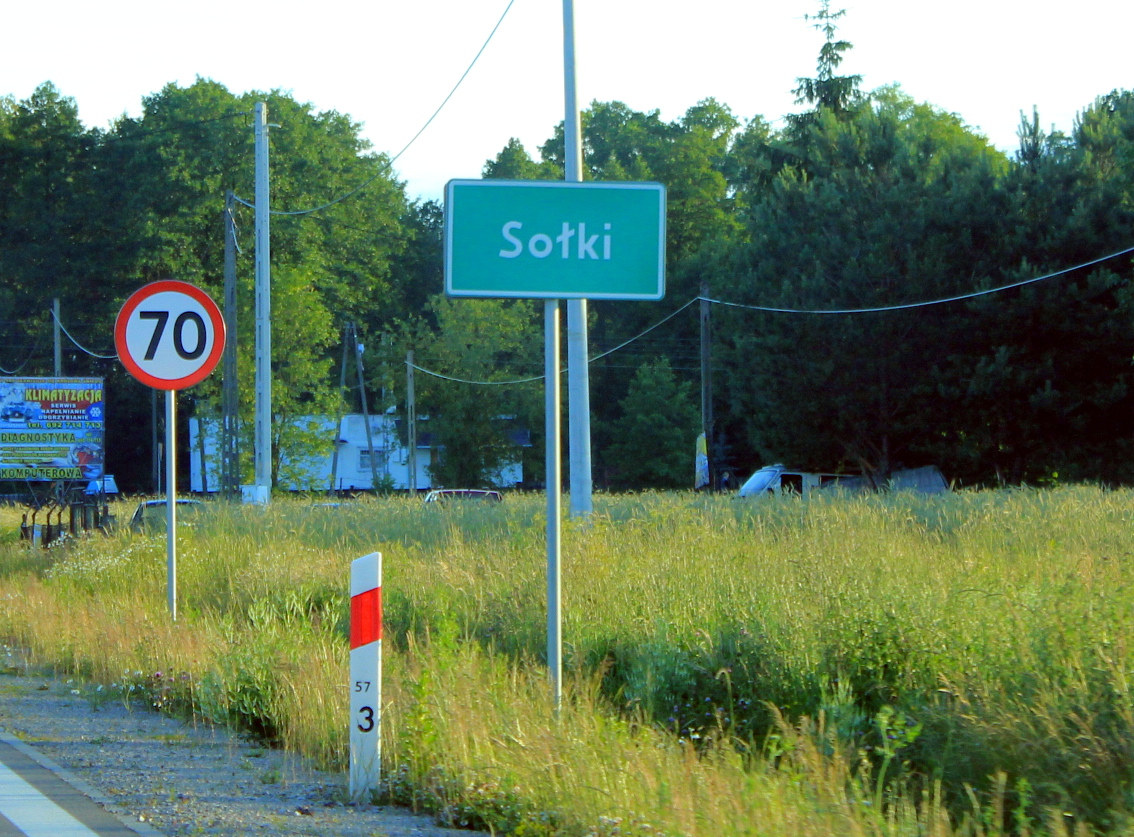

- Location within Poland
- Coordinates: 52°20′42″N 21°42′58″E
- Country: Poland
- Voivodeship: Masovian
- County: Mińsk
- Gmina: Dobre
- Population: 134

Sołki [ˈsɔu̯ki] is a village in the administrative district of Gmina Dobre, within Mińsk County, Masovian Voivodeship, in east-central Poland.
