= Olšany (Jihlava District) =

- Municipality
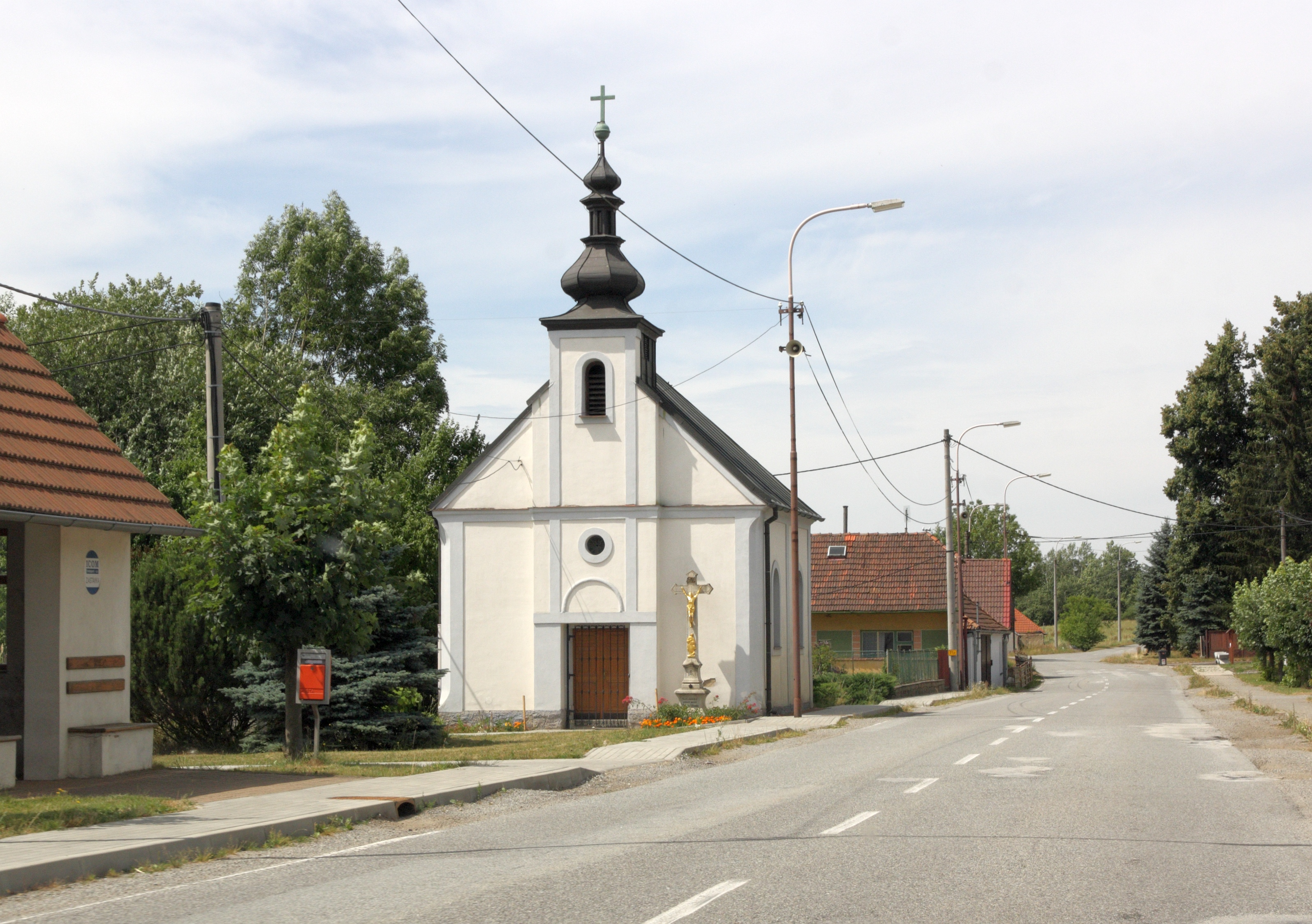
- Chapel of the Sacred Heart of the Lord

- Location in the Czech Republic
- Coordinates: 49°11′10″N 15°33′58″E
- Country: Czech Republic
- Region: Vysočina
- District: Jihlava
- First mentioned: 1257

Area
  - Total: 7.31 km^{2} (2.82 sq mi)
- Elevation: 623 m (2,044 ft)

Population (2026-01-01)
  - Total: 79
  - Density: 11/km^{2} (28/sq mi)
- Time zone: UTC+1 (CET)
  - Summer (DST): UTC+2 (CEST)
- Postal codes: 588 56
- Website: olsany.somt.cz

Olšany (Czech pronunciation: [ˈolʃanɪ]) is a municipality and village in Jihlava District in the Vysočina Region of the Czech Republic. It has about 80 inhabitants.

Olšany lies approximately 23 kilometres (14 mi) south of Jihlava and 130 km (81 mi) south-east of Prague.

== Demographics ==
Historical population
Year	Pop.	±%
1869	165	—
1880	162	−1.8%
1890	171	+5.6%
1900	165	−3.5%
1910	190	+15.2%
1921	169	−11.1%
1930	154	−8.9%
1950	135	−12.3%
1961	108	−20.0%
1970	95	−12.0%
1980	99	+4.2%
1991	80	−19.2%
2001	60	−25.0%
2011	75	+25.0%
2021	84	+12.0%
Source: Censuses
