= Wólka Kobylańska =

- Village
- Location within Poland
- Coordinates: 52°21′55″N 21°41′57″E
- Country: Poland
- Voivodeship: Masovian
- County: Mińsk
- Gmina: Dobre
- Population: 61

Wólka Kobylańska (Polish pronunciation: [ˈvulka kɔbɨˈlaj̃ska]) is a village in the administrative district of Gmina Dobre in Mińsk County, Masovian Voivodeship, in east-central Poland.
