= Adamów, Zamość County =

Adamów
- Village
- Location within Poland
- Coordinates: 50°35′43″N 23°9′12″E
- Country: Poland
- Voivodeship: Lublin
- County: Zamość
- Gmina: Adamów

Population
  - Total: 380

Adamów [aˈdamuf] is a village in Zamość County, Lublin Voivodeship, in eastern Poland. It is the seat of the gmina (administrative district) called Gmina Adamów.
