= Adamów, Mińsk County =

Adamów
- Village
- Location within Poland
- Coordinates: 52°16′47″N 21°42′8″E
- Country: Poland
- Voivodeship: Masovian
- County: Mińsk
- Gmina: Dobre

Adamów [aˈdamuf] is a village in the administrative district of Gmina Dobre, within Mińsk County, Masovian Voivodeship, in east-central Poland.
