= Kluky (Mladá Boleslav District) =

- Municipality
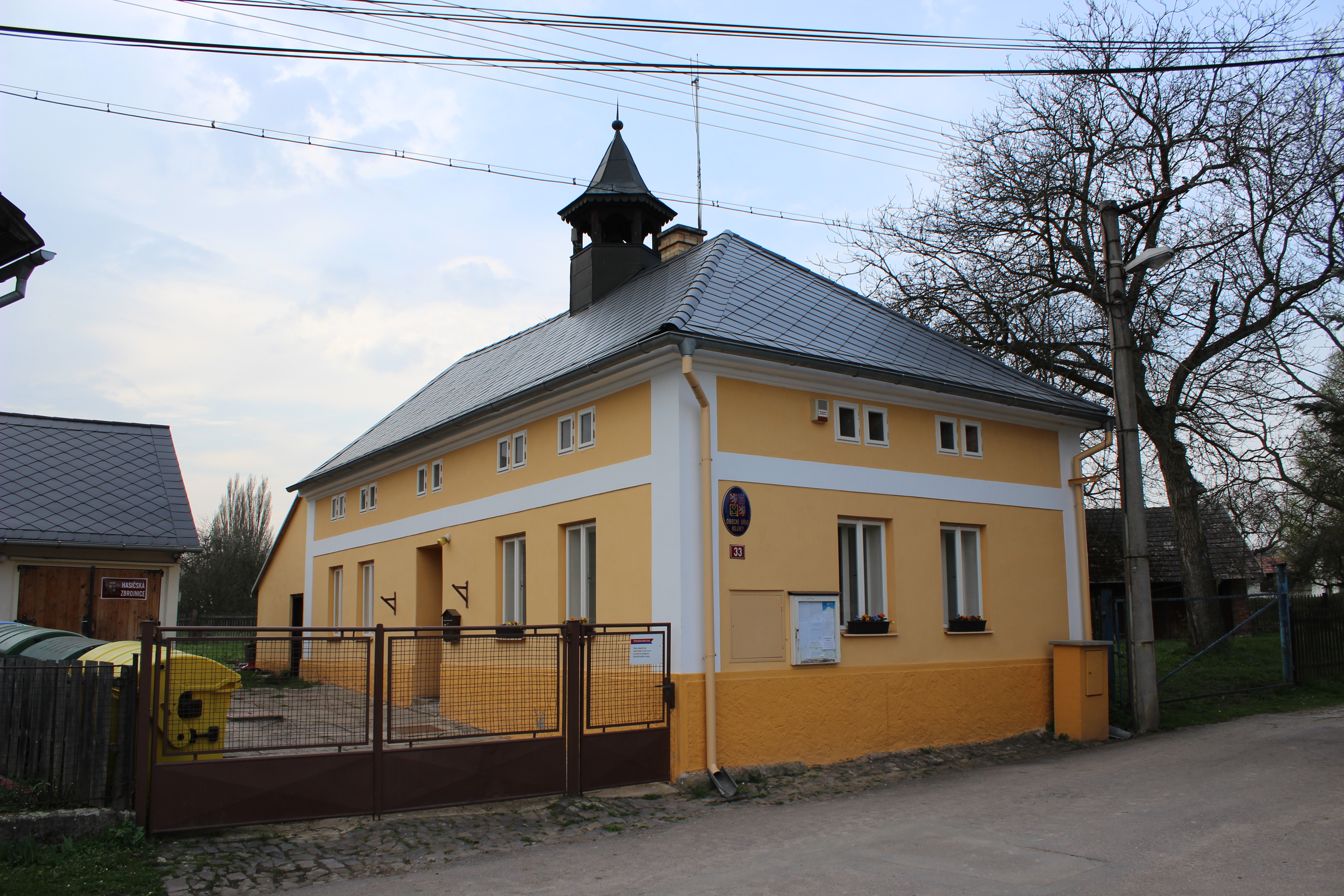
- Municipal office

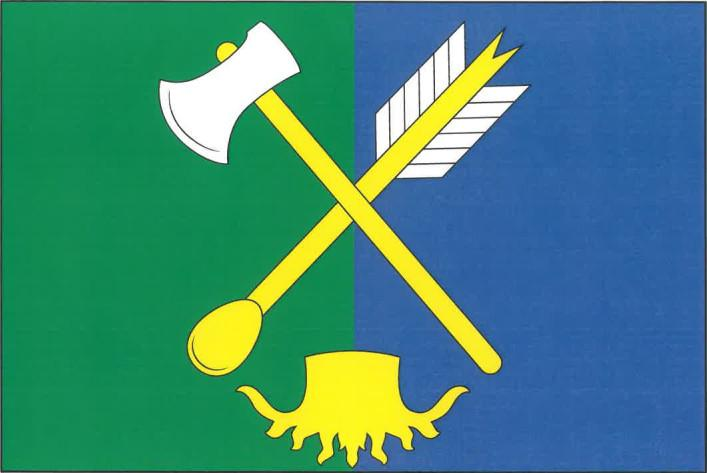
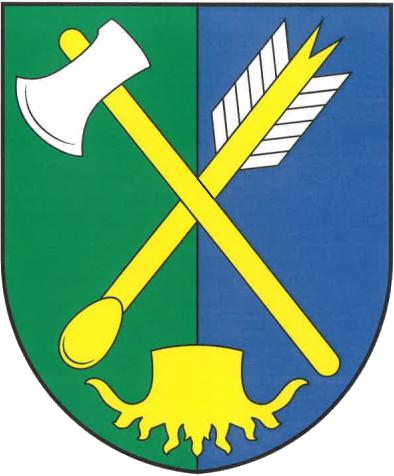
- Flag Coat of arms

- Location in the Czech Republic
- Coordinates: 50°26′25″N 14°43′31″E
- Country: Czech Republic
- Region: Central Bohemian
- District: Mladá Boleslav
- First mentioned: 1264

Area
  - Total: 5.53 km^{2} (2.14 sq mi)
- Elevation: 310 m (1,020 ft)

Population (2026-01-01)
  - Total: 71
  - Density: 13/km^{2} (33/sq mi)
- Time zone: UTC+1 (CET)
  - Summer (DST): UTC+2 (CEST)
- Postal code: 294 26
- Website: www.klukymb.eu

Kluky is a municipality and village in Mladá Boleslav District in the Central Bohemian Region of the Czech Republic. It has about 70 inhabitants. The village is well preserved and is protected as a village monument zone.

== Etymology ==
The name is derived from the old Czech word kluk, which denoted stumps and root networks, but also a plot full of these tree remains.

== Geography ==
Kluky is located about 13 kilometres (8 mi) west of Mladá Boleslav and 40 km (25 mi) northeast of Prague. It lies in the Jizera Table.

== History ==
The first written mention of Kluky is from 1264. The village was owned by various lesser aristocratic families. After the Battle of White Mountain, it was acquired by the Jesuits.

== Demographics ==
Historical population

Year	Pop.	±%
1869	288	—
1880	284	−1.4%
1890	280	−1.4%
1900	262	−6.4%
1910	250	−4.6%

Year	Pop.	±%
1921	286	+14.4%
1930	212	−25.9%
1950	183	−13.7%
1961	130	−29.0%
1970	119	−8.5%

Year	Pop.	±%
1980	91	−23.5%
1991	64	−29.7%
2001	57	−10.9%
2011	73	+28.1%
2021	67	−8.2%

Source: Censuses

== Transport ==
In Kluky is the train station called Trnová, located on the railway line Mělník–Mladějov, but in the off season it is only in operation on weekends.

== Sights ==
The almost entire built-up area is protected as a village monument zone. The village includes an extensive set of smaller cottages on narrow plots, among which timbered multi-storey houses from the end of the 18th century predominate.
