= Olšany (Klatovy District) =

- Municipality
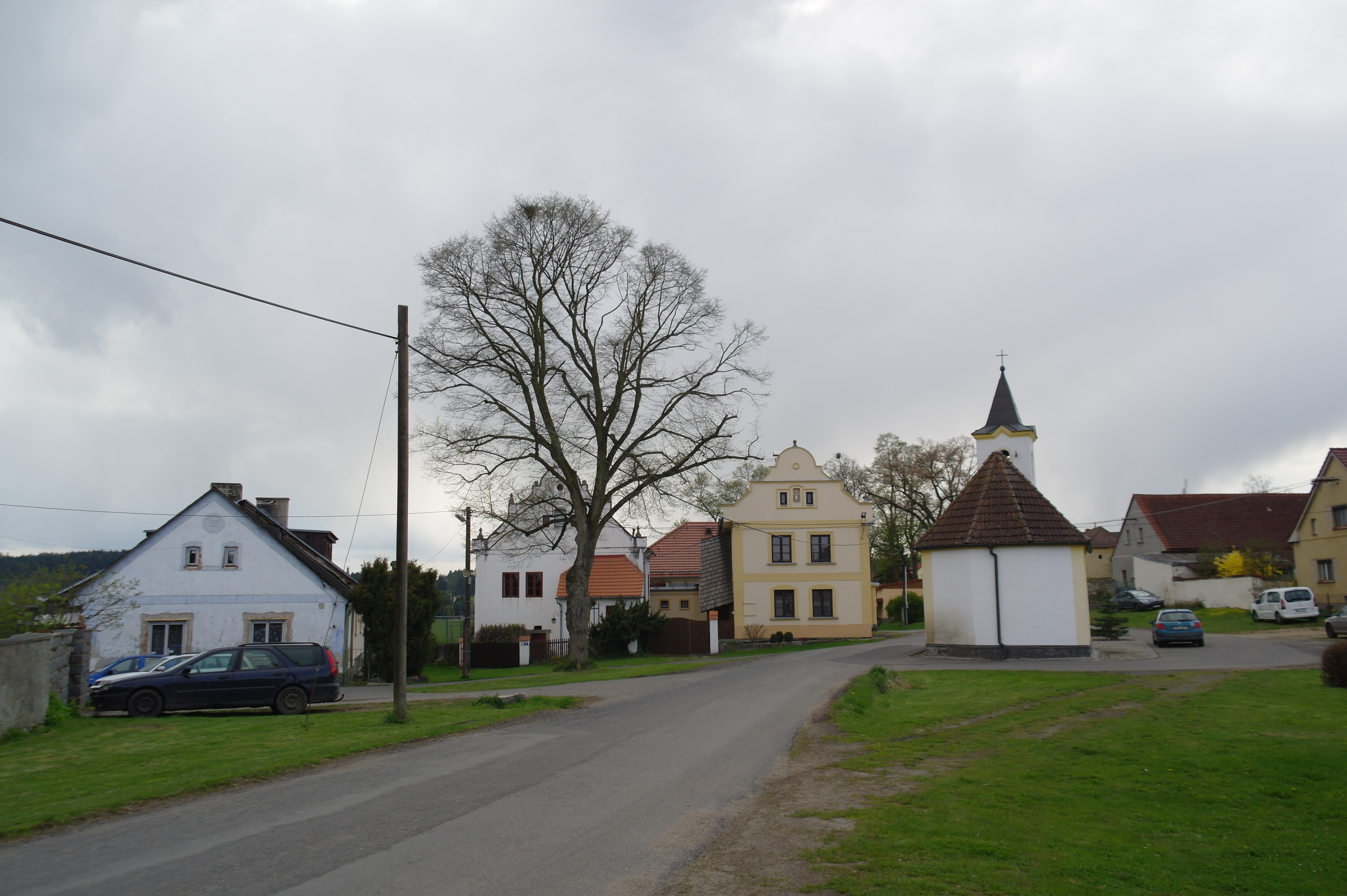
- Centre of Olšany

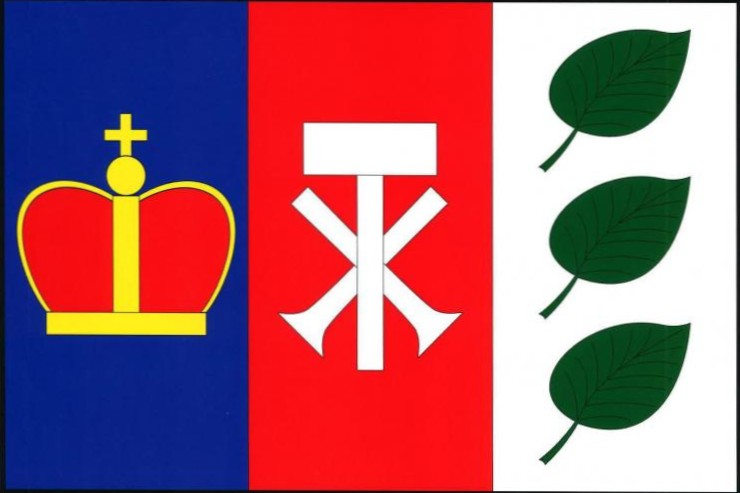
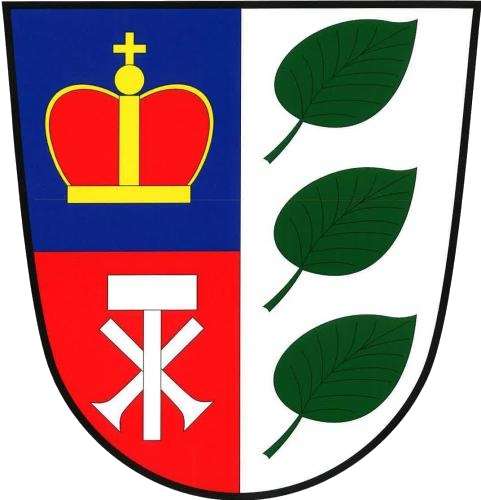
- Flag Coat of arms

- Location in the Czech Republic
- Coordinates: 49°24′3″N 13°37′37″E
- Country: Czech Republic
- Region: Plzeň
- District: Klatovy
- First mentioned: 1227

Area
  - Total: 3.18 km^{2} (1.23 sq mi)
- Elevation: 516 m (1,693 ft)

Population (2026-01-01)
  - Total: 197
  - Density: 61.9/km^{2} (160/sq mi)
- Time zone: UTC+1 (CET)
  - Summer (DST): UTC+2 (CEST)
- Postal code: 341 01
- Website: www.olsany-obec.eu

Olšany is a municipality and village in Klatovy District in the Plzeň Region of the Czech Republic. It has about 200 inhabitants.

Olšany lies approximately 25 kilometres (16 mi) east of Klatovy, 43 km (27 mi) south-east of Plzeň, and 96 km (60 mi) south-west of Prague.

== Demographics ==
Historical population
Year	Pop.	±%
1869	243	—
1880	201	−17.3%
1890	209	+4.0%
1900	253	+21.1%
1910	270	+6.7%
1921	248	−8.1%
1930	242	−2.4%
1950	215	−11.2%
1961	242	+12.6%
1970	217	−10.3%
1980	173	−20.3%
1991	198	+14.5%
2001	211	+6.6%
2011	206	−2.4%
2021	184	−10.7%
Source: Censuses
