= Duchów =

- Village
- Location within Poland
- Coordinates: 52°19′N 21°44′E
- Country: Poland
- Voivodeship: Masovian
- County: Mińsk
- Gmina: Dobre

Duchów [ˈduxuf] is a village in the administrative district of Gmina Dobre, within Mińsk County, Masovian Voivodeship, in east-central Poland.
