= Kluky (Kutná Hora District) =

- Municipality
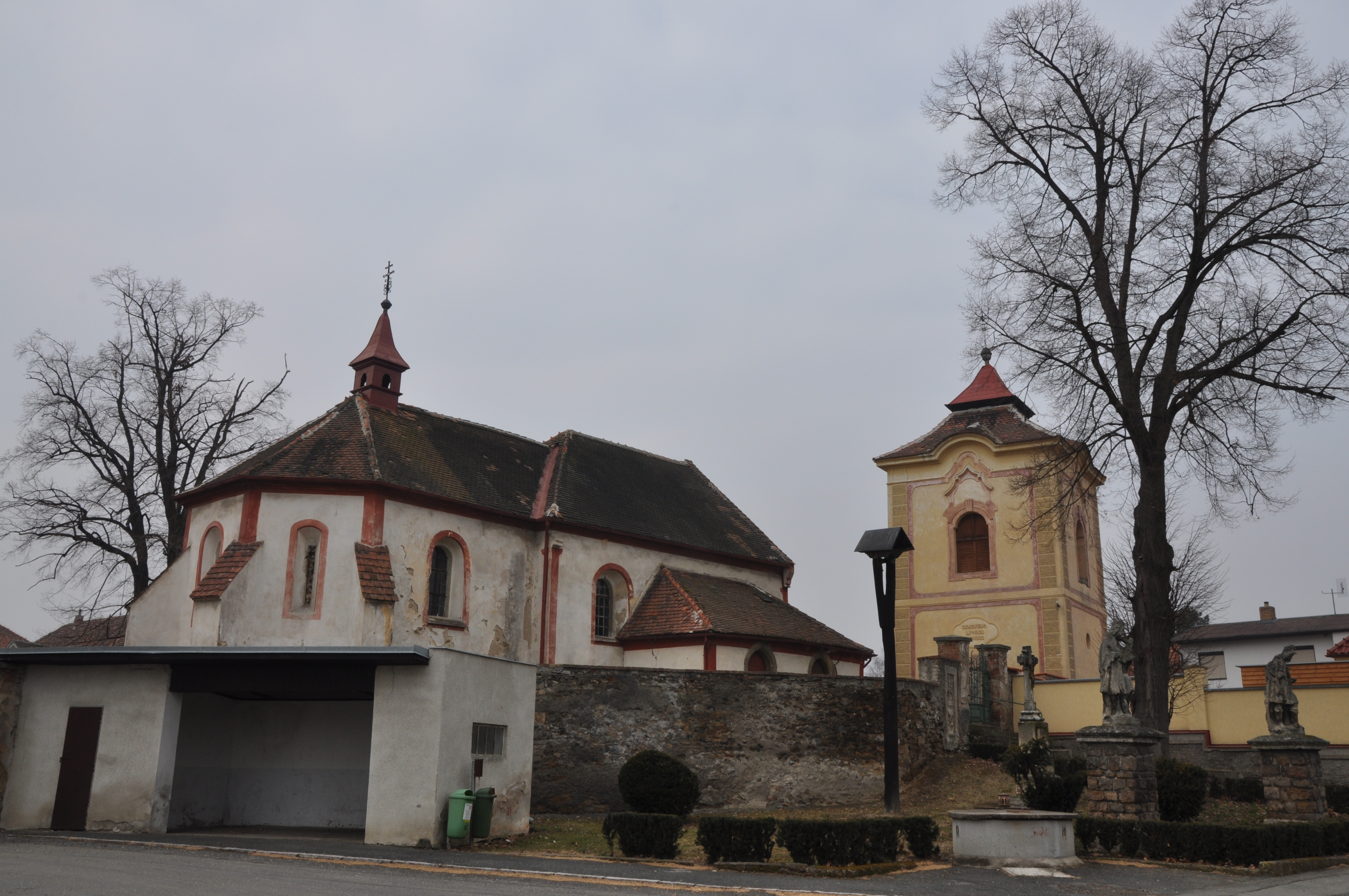
- Church of Saint John the Baptist

- Location in the Czech Republic
- Coordinates: 49°54′29″N 15°19′27″E
- Country: Czech Republic
- Region: Central Bohemian
- District: Kutná Hora
- First mentioned: 1289

Area
  - Total: 10.69 km^{2} (4.13 sq mi)
- Elevation: 258 m (846 ft)

Population (2026-01-01)
  - Total: 557
  - Density: 52.1/km^{2} (135/sq mi)
- Time zone: UTC+1 (CET)
  - Summer (DST): UTC+2 (CEST)
- Postal code: 285 45
- Website: www.kluky.cz

Kluky is a municipality and village in Kutná Hora District in the Central Bohemian Region of the Czech Republic. It has about 600 inhabitants.

== Administrative division ==
Kluky consists of four municipal parts (in brackets population according to the 2021 census):

- Kluky (375)
- Nová Lhota (73)
- Olšany (81)
- Pucheř (29)

== Etymology ==
The name is derived from the Old Czech word kluk, which denoted stumps and root networks, but also a plot full of these tree remains.

== Demographics ==
Historical population
Year	Pop.	±%
1869	1,210	—
1880	1,166	−3.6%
1890	1,244	+6.7%
1900	1,152	−7.4%
1910	1,105	−4.1%
1921	1,082	−2.1%
1930	934	−13.7%
1950	642	−31.3%
1961	736	+14.6%
1970	619	−15.9%
1980	515	−16.8%
1991	439	−14.8%
2001	440	+0.2%
2011	454	+3.2%
2021	558	+22.9%
Source: Censuses
