= Gmina Adamów, Zamość County =

Gmina Adamów Adamów Commune
- Gmina
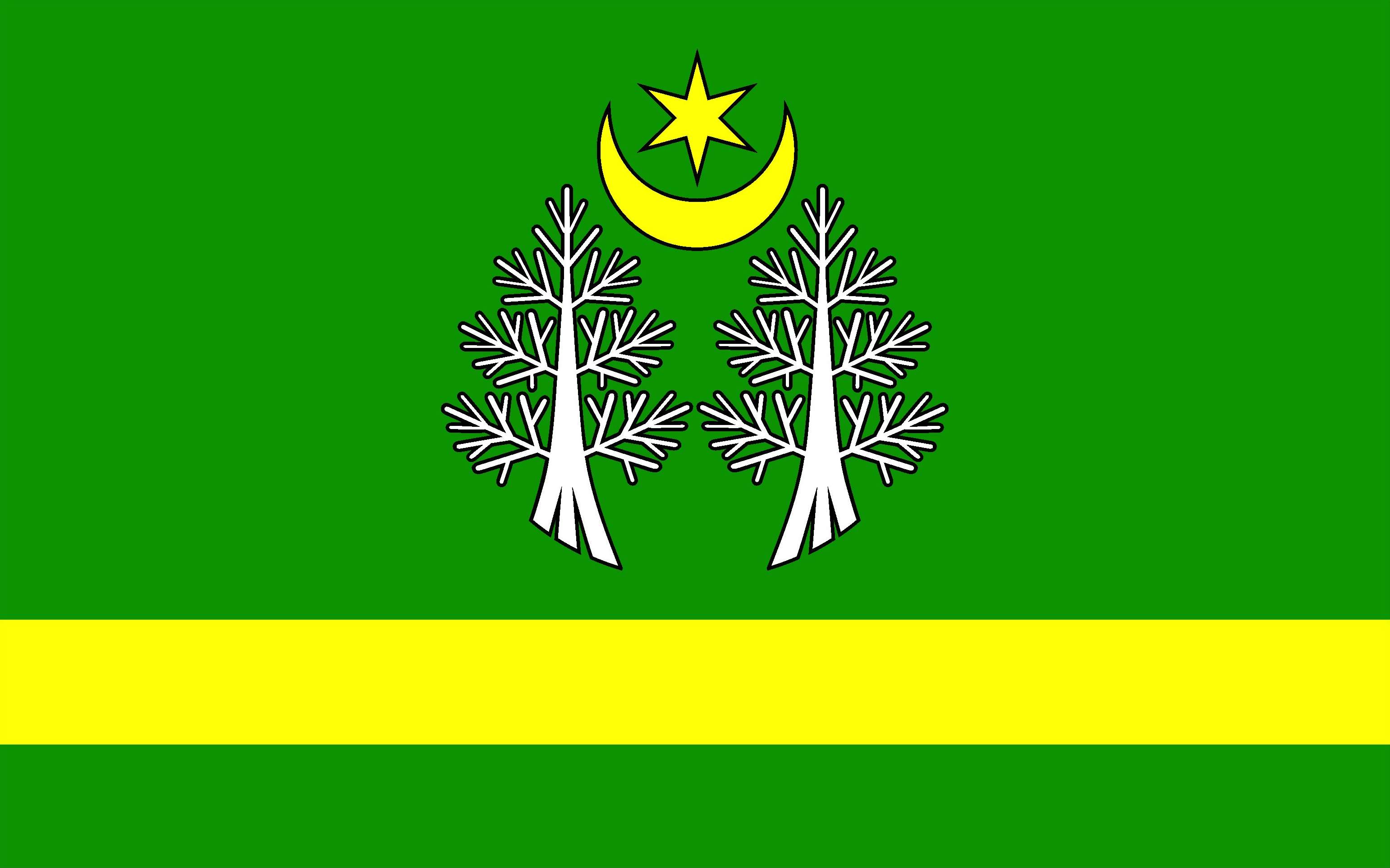
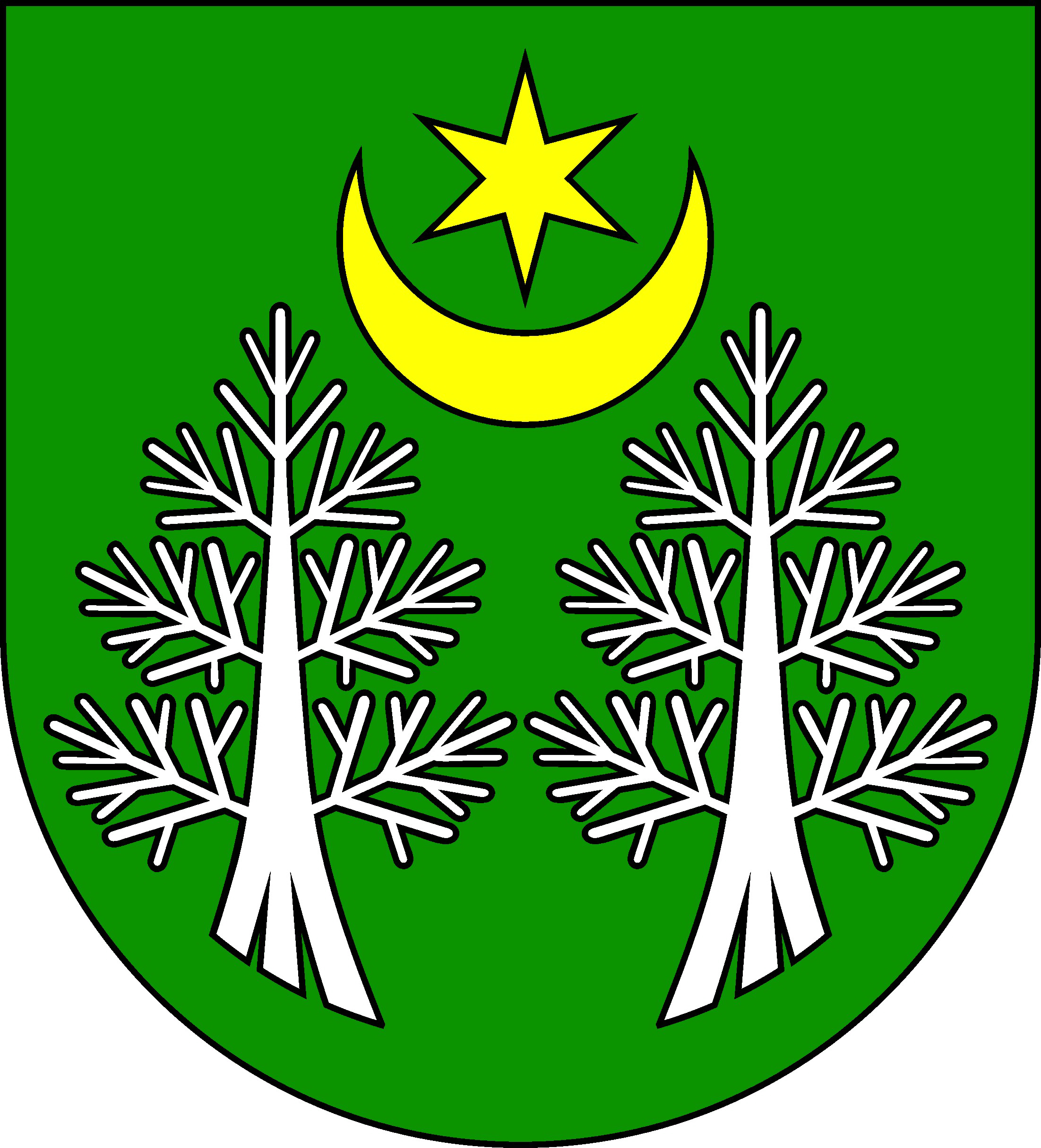
- Flag Coat of arms

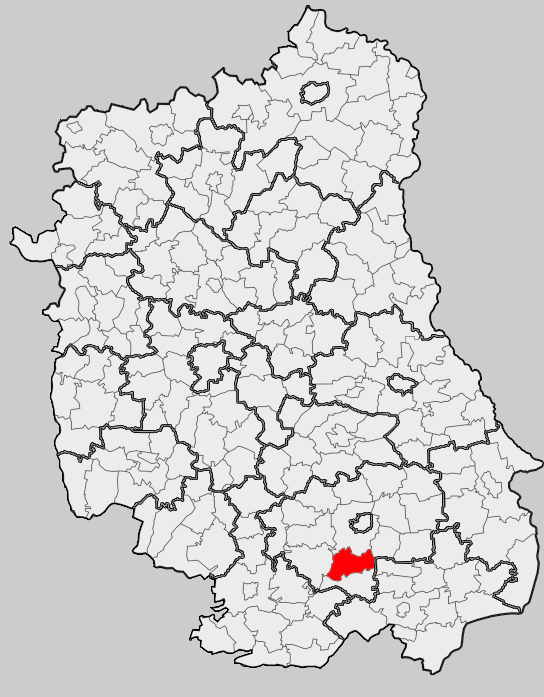
- Location within the county and voivodeship
- Coordinates (Adamów): 50°35′43″N 23°9′12″E
- Country: Poland
- Voivodeship: Lublin
- County: Zamość County
- Seat: Adamów

Area
  - Total: 110.55 km^{2} (42.68 sq mi)

Population (2013)
  - Total: 4,414
  - Density: 39.93/km^{2} (103.4/sq mi)
- Postal code: 21-412
- Vehicle registration: LLU
- Website: http://adamow.gmina.pl/

Gmina Adamów is a rural gmina (administrative district) in Zamość County, Lublin Voivodeship, in eastern Poland. Its seat is the village of Adamów, which lies approximately 16 kilometres (10 mi) south-west of Zamość and 84 km (52 mi) south-east of the regional capital Lublin.

The gmina covers an area of 110.55 square kilometres (42.7 sq mi), and as of 2006 its total population is 5,058 (4,871 in 2013).

== History ==
In the area there is a large park from the eighteenth and nineteenth centuries with wooden manor houses and a historical chapel from the nineteenth century.

During the Second World War, the commune of Adamów was an area of very lively partisan activity. Bondyrz was pacified three times by the Germans and today has a museum of the history of the World Association of Home Army Soldiers.

The armed uprising took place on 30 December 1942 in the town of Wojda. That date was considered to be the beginning of the Zamość uprising, which lasted until 25 July 1944.

== Neighbouring gminas ==
Gmina Adamów is bordered by the gminas of Krasnobród, Krynice, Łabunie, Zamość and Zwierzyniec.

== Public administration ==
As of 2024 the mayor is Krzysztof Pilip. The office is located at Adamów 11b, 22-442 Adamów

== Villages ==
The gmina contains the following villages with the status of sołectwo:

Adamów,
Bliżów
Bondyrz
Boża Wola
Bródki
Bondyrz
Feliksówka
Grabnik
Jacnia
Malinówka
Potoczek
Rachodoszcze
Suchowola
Suchowola-Kolonia
Szewnia Dolna
Szewnia Górna
Trzepieciny
