= Bartelski =

Bartelski, feminine: Bartelska is a Polish surname. Notable people with this surname include:

- Konrad Bartelski (born 1954), British alpine skier
- Lesław Bartelski (1920–2006), Polish writer
- Wojciech Bartelski (born 1977), Polish politician and chess player
