= 3rd Battalion of the Military Units of the Uprising Emergency of Socialists =

Battalion of the Military Units of the Uprising Emergency of Socialists

- III Batalion OW PPS
- Active: August 1, 1944–August 6, 1944
- Country: Polish Underground State
- Allegiance: Wola Subdistrict (Home Army)
- Type: ground force
- Garrison/HQ: Warsaw
- Patron: Stefan Aleksander Okrzeja
- Engagements: Warsaw Uprising

Commanders
- First commander: Captain Karol Kryński, codenamed Waga

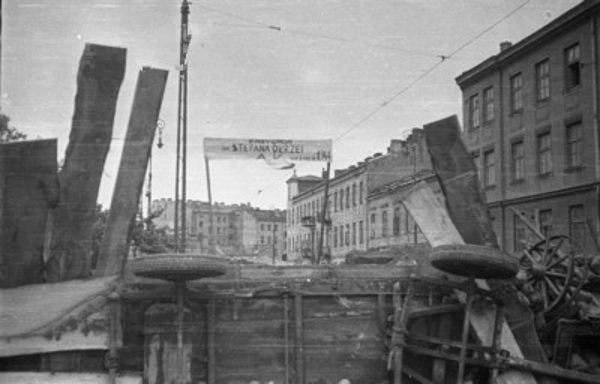
Okrzeja barricade in Wola

Stefan Okrzeja 3rd Battalion of the Military Units of the Uprising Emergency of Socialists was a battalion of the Military Units of the Uprising Emergency of Socialists; it existed from May 1940 to August 1944. As part of the unification process with the Home Army, it was incorporated in 1942 into the Wola Subdistrict.

Starting on 1 August, the battalion took part in battles in Wola, defending a barricade on Wolska Street and the tram depot on Młynarska Street. During the fighting from 1 to 5 August, it suffered heavy losses, with nearly 60% of its soldiers killed or succumbing to their wounds. Some of the battalion's platoons were incorporated into the 3rd Wola Company of the Leśnik Group and participated in battles in Muranów and the Old Town, while others joined the Stefan Battalion in southern Śródmieście. Some of its soldiers also formed the Wola Company within the 6th Battalion of the Workers' Militia of the Polish Socialist Party, which carried out support tasks in the Old Town and later, until 3 October 1944, in Śródmieście.

== History of the battalion ==
The 3rd Battalion of the Military Units of the Uprising Emergency of Socialists was formed from the Wola Workers Battalion of the Defense of Warsaw, which participated in the defense of the city in September 1939. In May 1940, employees of the Lilpop, Rau i Loewenstein factories, members of the party militia of the Socialist Action – Stefan Bieniasz, Edward Adamski, and Jan Kozłowski – began forming the first groups. The unit was initially organized as the cadre of the 3rd Wola Battalion of the People's Guard for Freedom, Equality, and Independence. It initially consisted of three cadre companies and by 1943, six. In 1940, the unit was made up of three command teams organizing the companies. By early 1941, the battalion had grown to three cadre companies of 40–60 soldiers each. By 1942, the battalion consisted of 170 soldiers. The commander and organizer of the unit was Stefan Bieniasz, codenamed Jagniątko, who served as head of the Military Department of the Polish Socialist Party in the Wola district. After his arrest in April 1944, the leadership of the department and the position of the battalion commander was taken over by Sergeant Edward Adamski, codenames Czarny, Major. The training commander from 1942 was Captain Karol Kryński, codenamed Waga. At the turn of 1942 and 1943, the battalion was named after Stefan Okrzeja.

Until 1941, the battalion consisted of employees from the Wola district:

- 1st Company (commander – Sergeant Edward Adamski, codenamed Czarny) – future platoon 321, mainly consisting of workers from the Lilpop, Rau i Loewenstein factory, the former Gerlach factory, and railwaymen from the Wola locomotive depot.
- 2nd Company (commander – Senior Fireman Jan Ostrowski, codenamed Hart) – future platoon 323, mostly consisting of employees from the Construction and Road Department of the Warsaw Tramway Company. This company organized a sabotage group in cooperation with the Kedyw platoon from Wola.
- 3rd Company (commander – Corporal Wiktor Łuniewski, codenamed Radomiak) – future platoon 337, consisting of residents of the Workers' Housing Society in Koło and union activists.

In 1941, youth groups from the dismantled Orlęta conspiratorial groups of the Shooting Union, including Jerzy Mieszkowski, codenamed Myszka and Edward Olszewski, codenamed Synek, were incorporated into the unit (platoon 323). Due to a shortage of officers, five soldiers who had passed their high school exams were sent to a cadet course organized by the Warsaw People's Guard group. In December 1941, the following soldiers graduated from the cadet school: Roman Kossakiewicz, codenamed Kosa, Bogdan Ołtarzewski, codenamed Lis, Jerzy Mieszkowski, codenamed Myszka, Tadeusz Chrobociński, codenamed Dąbek, and Janusz Kwieciński, codenamed Gryf. As a result, the formation of additional companies began.

Between 1942 and 1943, around 180 new soldiers (mostly youth) joined the battalion, enabling the creation of three additional companies:

- 4th Company, commander – Second Lieutenant Edward Śmieszek, codenamed Sęp;
- 5th Company, commander – Senior Sergeant Marian Brzozowski, codenamed Dąb;
- 6th Company, commander – Senior Sergeant Tadeusz Rogowski, codenamed Szewc.

Between 1942 and 1943, two additional groups (section commanders: Jerzy Kamiński, codenamed Tur, and Czabalski, codenamed Cubczyk) were trained in cadet courses.

Soldiers of the battalion participated in the underground factories of weapons and ammunition of the Home Army. On 6 April 1944, the German forces uncovered the Kinga ammonite factory at 103 Solec Street. During the ensuing battle, several soldiers of the 3rd Battalion fell, including Mieczysław Zawadzki, codenamed Lotnik – the commander of the crew, Stanisław Zygnierski, codenamed Stanek – deputy commander of the crew, Edward Bolechowski, codenamed Eddy, Zdzisław Dziudzi, codenamed Zdzich, and Aleksander Załęski, codenamed Kindzior. According to other sources, during this battle, the commander and organizer of the battalion, Stefan Bieniasz, codenamed Grzeg (executed in mid-May 1944), was arrested. However, his name does not appear in the accounts of this tragedy.

The details of the battalion's involvement in sabotage actions within the district remain unknown. It is only stated that Platoon 323's commander, Senior Fireman Jan Ostrowski, codenamed Hart, cooperating with his platoon with the Home Army Diversion DB-16 Unit, organized an assassination attempt on Alfred Dehnel, the German head of the Wola Tram Depot. The assassination on Dehnel on 11 May 1943 is mentioned in the findings of Tomasz Strzembosz, who refers to an unknown group that carried out the attack. This is likely due to a lack of information on the activities of the DB-16 Unit. According to the findings of researcher Henryk Witkowski, it is known only that: "From overheard comments and opinions about this unit, one can assume that those in it were strongly connected with the local community with left-wing political views".

=== Order of battle, 1 August 1944 ===
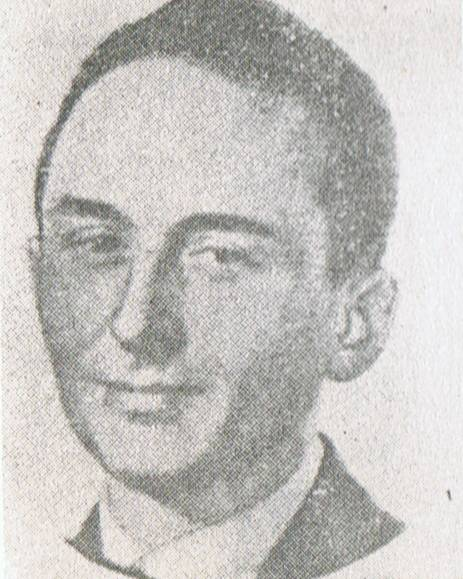
Captain of the reserves Karol Kryński, codenamed Waga – commander of the 3rd Battalion of the Military Units of the Uprising Emergency of Socialists

On the eve of the Warsaw Uprising, the 3rd Battalion of the Military Units of the Uprising Emergency of Socialists formed a grouping of the Wola Subdistrict. The area commander was Captain Stanisław Stefaniak, codenamed Stefan. According to initial reports, the battalion consisted of six platoons, numbering about 400 soldiers. According to Andrzej Czystowski, the battalion had 420 soldiers and 95 weapons, including four heavy machine guns.

- 3rd Battalion command:
  - Commander – Captain Karol Kryński, codenamed Waga
  - Deputy – Lieutenant Julian Sawicki, codenamed Rafał
  - Chief of Staff – Platoon Leader Jan Kozłowski, codenamed Iwan
  - Political Chief – Staff Sergeant Edward Adamski, codenamed Czarny
- Battalion platoons
  - Platoon 317 – Commander: Second Lieutenant Eugeniusz Śmieszek, codenamed Sęp (according to other sources, Second Lieutenant Jan Gutt, codenamed Wosiek)
  - Platoon 321A – Commander: Second Lieutenant of Signals Ernest Jaśkowiak, codenamed Czarny
  - Platoon 323 – Commander: Master Firefighter Jan Ostrowski, codenamed Hart
  - Platoon 335 – Commander: Staff Sergeant Marian Brzozowski, codenamed Dąb
  - Platoon 336 – Commander: Staff Sergeant Tadeusz Rogowski, codenamed Szewc
  - Platoon 337 – Commander: Sergeant Wiktor Łuniewski, codenamed Radomiak

The battalion was also supported by the 3rd Company of the Workers' Militia of the Polish Socialist Party, numbering about 250 people, and a platoon of the Women's Military Service of the Military Units of the Uprising Emergency of Socialists, commanded by Janina Iwanowska, codenamed Maria. According to Adam Przygoński, the commander of the Militia Company of the Polish Socialist Party was Lieutenant Henryk Kański, codenamed Kadra. The battalion comprised three officers, 18 cadets, and about 90 non-commissioned officers.

On 28 July 1944, after the declaration of readiness in the Home Army units, the transfer of weapons to the designated concentration point began – from 48 Młynarska Street and 136 Wolska Street to assembly points in houses on Ludwiki and Krochmalna streets, as well as at the corner of Karolkowa and Wolska streets. The operation was organized by Captain Karol Kryński, codenamed Waga, Master Firefighter Jan Ostrowski, codenamed Hart, and Staff Sergeant Władysław Czerwiński, codenamed Stefan. During the transport of weapons on Wolska Street, near Karolkowa Street, an additional Hungarian supply cart was seized, carrying three heavy machine guns, rifles, and ammunition. The captured equipment was stored in the courtyard at 33 Płocka Street.

== Warsaw Uprising ==
=== Defense of Wola ===
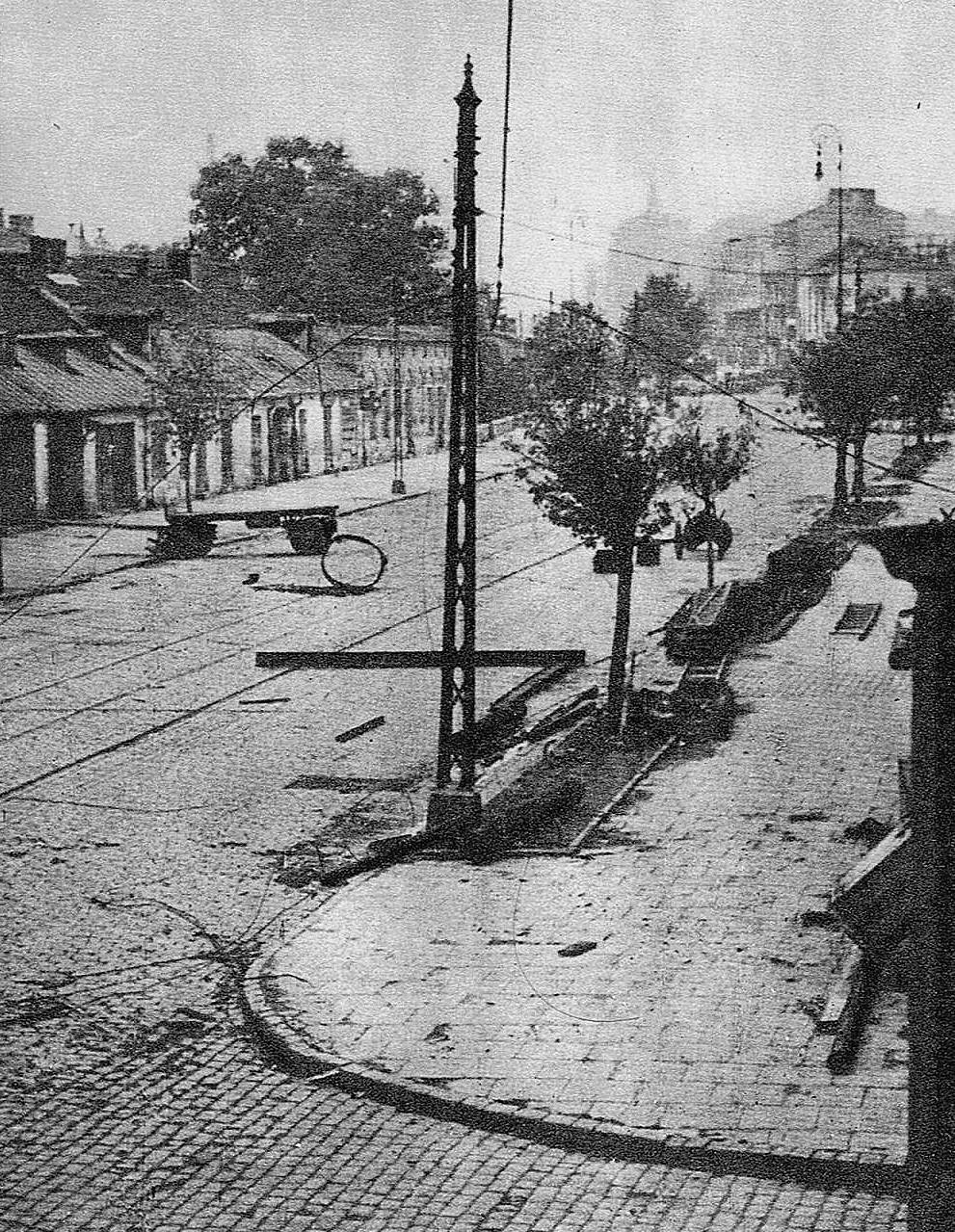
Wolska Street on 1 August 1944 a few hours after the start of the uprising

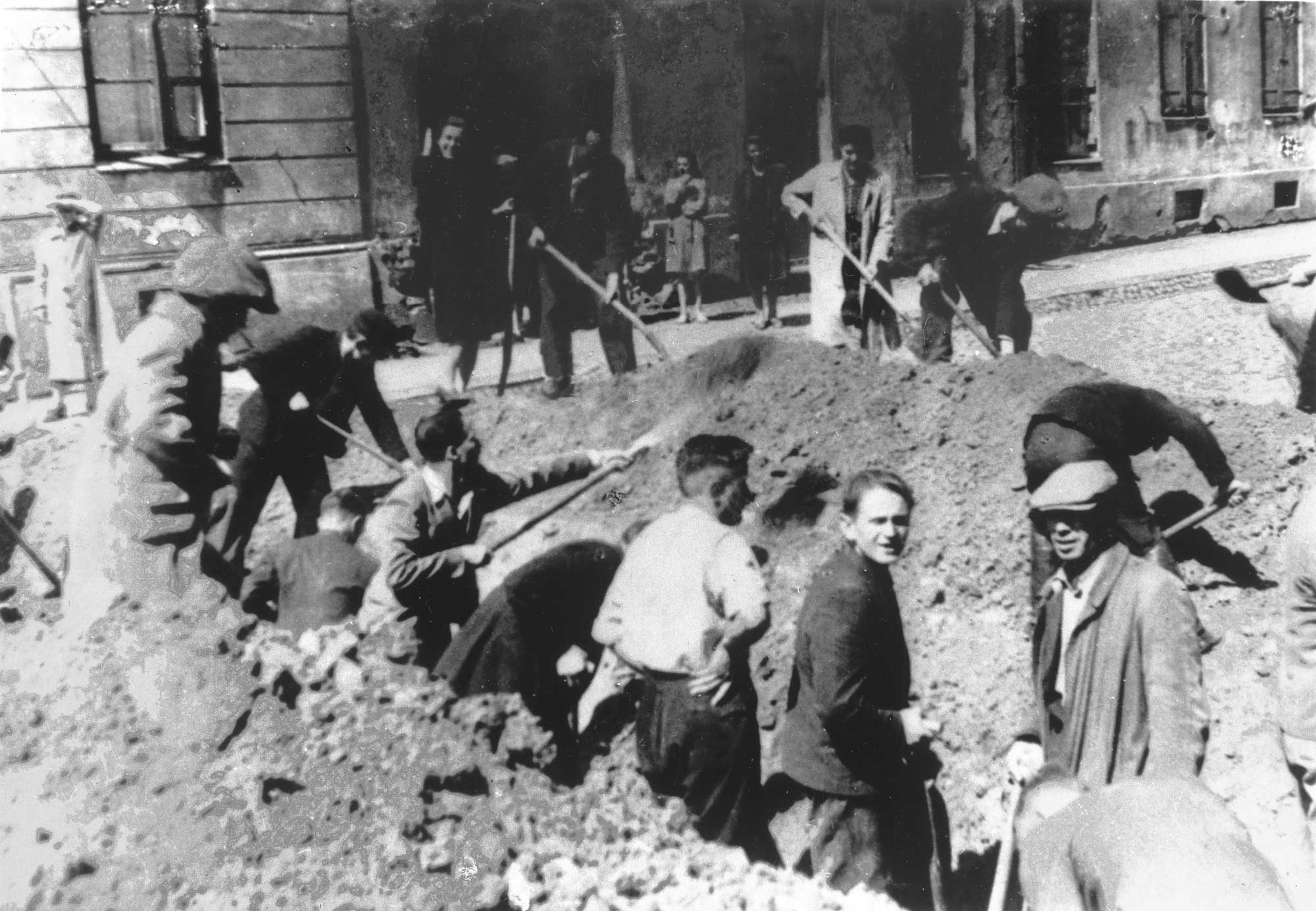
Construction of a barricade in Wola

On 1 August, the designated assembly point was the Church of the Redemptorist Fathers at 49 Karolkowa Street. Around 400 soldiers and militiamen gathered, armed with 26 rifles, 52 pistols, and one heavy machine gun, along with 120 bottles of gasoline. In his research, Ryszard Maciąg estimates the number of battalion soldiers at between 400 and 420, including 200 in the first wave. According to Adam Borkiewicz, about 200 soldiers assembled at the meeting point. Testimonies collected by Stanisław Podlewski indicate that men were also sent to retrieve a heavy machine gun from Płocka Street, which led to reports that the battalion had four heavy machine guns. Lesław Bartelski states that these consisted of three wz. 30 heavy machine guns and one MG 08.

The units of the Wola Subdistrict did not receive weapons from the district command, which prevented them from undertaking significant actions. Current findings suggest that the battalion was likely the only armed unit among the 22 platoons of the Wola Subdistrict. According to plans, it was supposed to capture key locations on Skierniewicka Street, the Warszawa Zachodnia station, and Fort Wola.

At 5:00 PM, the battalion took control of the Woka marmalade factory at the corner of Górczewska and Leszno streets, while the Workers' Militia of the Polish Socialist Party unit seized the tram depot without resistance. Other accounts suggest that the depot was not taken until nightfall by the Workers' Militia of the Polish Socialist Party and a unit of the People's Army under Second Lieutenant Zbigniew Paszkowski, codenamed Stach.

At dusk, construction began on a barricade at the corner of Leszno and Górczewska streets, as well as on Wolska Street. Non-commissioned officers of the Workers' Militia, Henryk Słabuszewski and Józef Tulikowski, moved tram cars filled with sand and scrap metal to reinforce the barricade and secured the depot. The Workers' Militia took up positions in the tram depot and on the southern side of Wolska Street, while the Military Units of the Uprising Emergency of Socialists battalion held the section of Młynarska Street between Wolska and Górczewska streets. According to Military Units of the Uprising Emergency soldiers, the People's Army unit was subordinated to the battalion, though historian Antoni Przygoński questioned these accounts.

A battalion unit consisting of 60 soldiers, along with a platoon of the People's Army, defended the barricade at Wolska and Młynarska streets against an attack by German tanks. The situation was saved by a counterattack from units of the Czata 49 and Pięść battalions. The Germans managed to break through the improvised barricade on Młynarska Street, but fire from Michler's Mill and surrounding houses (held by the People's Army, the Military Units of the Uprising Emergency, and Platoon 300) forced them to retreat. Around 30 German soldiers were killed in the fighting. At around 4:00 PM, a counterattack was launched by units of the Wola Subdistrict and the Radosław Group in the area of Górczewska Street. Soldiers from the Czata Battalion and the Military Units of the Uprising Emergency battalion under the command of Lieutenant Henryk Sawicki, codenamed Rafał, took part in the assault. The Czata Battalion suffered six killed and 18 wounded, while the Military Units of the Uprising Emergency battalion lost four killed and 11 wounded. Despite these losses, the Germans were forced to withdraw. As a result of the battle, the defenders of the barricade gained additional weapons abandoned by the enemy. On the same day, battalion units captured a grenade launcher and several rifles on Kalinki Street. Another account suggests that this weaponry was seized during the night of 1–2 August in a joint assault by the Military Units of the Uprising Emergency and the People's Army on the tram depot.

At 8:00 AM, battalion soldiers, alongside other barricade defenders – including a People's Army unit under Staff Sergeant Lech Matawowski, codenamed Mirek and the platoon of Warrant Officer Władysław Kulasek, codenamed Jaśmin (1st Company of the 2nd Area, commanded by Lieutenant Wacław Stykowski, codenamed Hal) – repelled a tank attack. German forces used civilians as human shields in front of their tanks to prevent the insurgents from opening fire. At the same time, German infantry set fire to houses on Wolska Street. After the attack was repelled, Second Lieutenant Czarny's platoon from the Parasol Battalion was sent to reinforce the barricade. Other reports mention that the Military Units of the Uprising Emergency unit, together with soldiers of the People's Army under Sergeant Lech Matawowski, codenamed Mirek, also secured the entrance to Działdowska Street.

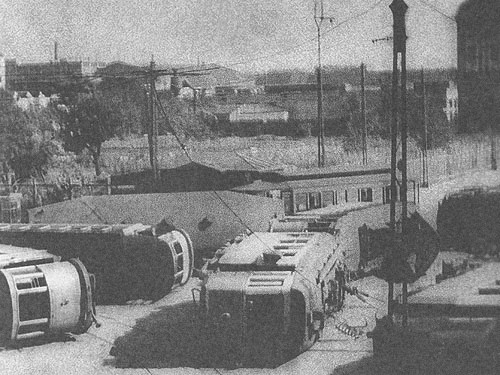
Tram cars forming the barricade at the corner of Młynarska and Wolska streets

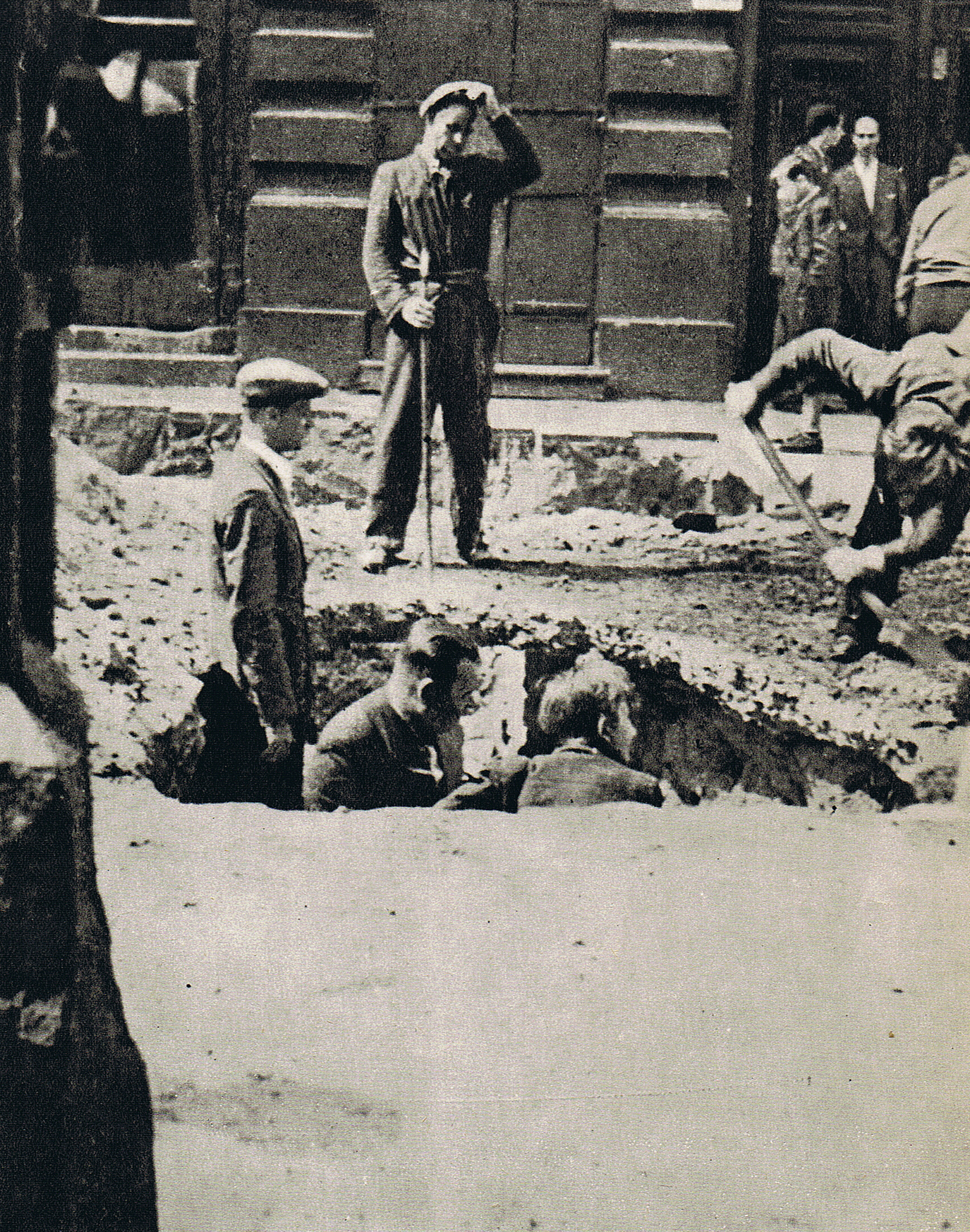
Construction of an anti-tank ditch at the Wola barricade. Probably Wolska Street

At 10:30 AM, the Germans launched another assault. Their tanks advanced under the cover of around 300 men and women taken from nearby houses as human shields. Despite fierce resistance, which resulted in the destruction of one tank and the damaging of another, the defense was eventually broken.

Around 12:00 PM, the tanks broke through to the exit of Młynarska Street, and the civilian population was forced to dismantle the barricade. Through the gap created, several tanks passed. Units of the Military Units of the Uprising Emergency, the People's Army, and platoons led by Warrant Officer Władysław Kulasek, codenamed Jaśmin, and Second Lieutenant Tadeusz Chorążyk, codenamed Czarny, were pushed back from the defense line. The tanks advanced through Towarowa Street and further into Aleje Jerozolimskie. After breaking through, they attacked infantry units. The Military Units of the Uprising Emergency unit was pushed toward the tram depot on Młynarska Street. The Germans, using deception (wearing insurgent armbands), took control of several houses on Młynarska Street, murdering the inhabitants.

By 4:00 PM, the defenders of the barricade had lost: two dead soldiers from the People's Army, six dead from Platoon 300 and other units of Captain Hal's command, and 23 dead and 16 wounded from the Military Units of the Uprising Emergency battalion. Among the wounded were Staff Sergeant Edward Adamski, codenamed Czarny, the battalion's political chief, Lieutenant Henryk Sawicki, codenamed Rafał, Platoon 317 commander Second Lieutenant Edward Śmieszek, codenamed Sęp, and Platoon 323 commander Senior Fireman Jan Ostrowski, codenamed Hart. During the fighting, the crews of two Polish heavy machine guns were killed. Around 3:00 PM, Captain Karol Kryński, codenamed Waga, who was mortally wounded at the position of a destroyed heavy machine gun, died on 5 August after being transferred to the hospital. The battalion command was assumed by Captain Stanisław Stefaniak, codenamed Stefan. Other sources indicate that command passed to Lieutenant Jan Gut, codenamed Wosiek.

After the tanks broke through, the defenders from the Military Units of the Uprising Emergency and the People's Army returned to their positions, retaking the barricade in a fight that lasted until dusk. One of the most notable soldiers defending the barricade, according to Lieutenant Wacław Stykowski, codenamed Hal, was Staff Sergeant Mirek (Lech Matawowski) from the People's Army and Sergeant Cadet Wiatr (Bolesław Zmorzyński) from the Military Units of the Uprising Emergency. During the night of 3–4 August, the barricade was rebuilt with a deep anti-tank ditch. The position was immediately occupied by the soldiers of the Military Units of the Uprising Emergency battalion, who also took control of the buildings on the southern side of Wolska Street (the St. Stanislaus Hospital buildings were considered a demilitarized zone under the Red Cross flag).

On 4 August at 11:00 AM, another German assault took place, preceded by several hours of mortar fire and an air raid by 34 dive bombers. In the Military Units of the Uprising Emergency battalion, the bombing of the Woka factory resulted in the deaths of 15 soldiers and the wounding of 28. Around 11:00 AM, the Germans approached the barricades. Due to the weakened defenses, the commander of Kedyw reinforced them with a reserve unit under the command of Captain Sawa. The attack was repelled, but the area continued to be shelled with artillery and grenade launchers, and additional air raids occurred at approximately 12:20 PM and 2:14 PM.

At dawn on 5 August, the Military Units of the Uprising Emergency battalions were still holding the barricade on Wolska Street. The southern security of the entire defensive line, from Powązki Cemetery to St. Stanislaus Hospital on Wolska Street, was maintained by the Workers' Militia. The initial attack by Heinz Reinefarth's group around 7:00 AM was repelled, with soldiers from the People's Army platoon destroying a tank. Around 8:00 AM, a Military Units of the Uprising Emergency platoon stationed at the Franaszek Factory, in front of the barricade and near the St. Stanislaus Hospital buildings, allowed the Germans to advance and then opened effective fire, forcing them to retreat.

According to Lesław Bartelski, approximately 200 soldiers defended the barricade at that time – 100 from the Military Units of the Uprising Emergency, a unit of the Czwartacy, and Czarny's platoon from the Parasol Battalion. Their armament included three heavy machine guns, one grenade launcher, 62 rifles, 16 submachine guns, and 260 grenades. According to Adam Przygoński, the main front line from Ożarowska Street, along Płocka and Wolska streets, to the tram depot on Młynarska Street was defended by 400 soldiers, including 150 from the People's Army and around 100 from the Military Units of the Uprising Emergency. In accounts cited by Przygoński from Military Units of the Uprising Emergency soldiers, there were 232 armed fighters – 98 from the Military Units of the Uprising Emergency, 14 from the People's Army, and 120 from the Home Army. The attack was carried out by a German force of 3,000 soldiers supported by a company of heavy tanks.

At around 11:00 AM, SS-Sonderregiment Dirlewanger units stormed the Józef Sowiński Municipal Gymnasium on Kalinki Street, and by 12:00 PM, they had entered the tram depot defended by the Workers' Militia and the Military Units of the Uprising Emergency, attacking the barricade from the south. At the same time, they executed 36 captured People's Socialist Party soldiers. Sergeant Cadet Bolesław Zmorzyński, codenamed Wicher, was seriously wounded (he was murdered in the hospital on 7 August). Around 2:00 PM (or, according to other sources, 3:00 PM), the barricade fell. Captain Hal ordered the wounded and unarmed fighters to retreat to Wronia Street. The Military Units of the Uprising Emergency battalion, along with the Workers' Militia, was pushed back toward Śródmieście. That day, according to accounts collected by Antoni Przygoński, 47 battalion soldiers were killed and 18 wounded, while Lesław Bartelski's sources indicate 11 People's Socialist Party soldiers killed and 18 wounded.

On 6 August, the units, along with the district commander, withdrew towards the Evangelical–Augsburg Cemetery. By order of Lieutenant Colonel Jan Mazurkiewicz, codenamed Radosław, the units moved to the site of the Gęsiówka camp, which had been captured the day before. Major Jan Tarnowski, codenamed Waligóra, along with a group of officers and Platoon 300, for unknown reasons, decided to recapture the Woka factory. At the intersection of Żytnia and Okopowa streets, the group was attacked by tanks. Both Waligóra and Second Lieutenant Ernest Jaśkowiak, codenamed Czarny, of the Military Units of the Uprising Emergency were seriously wounded. The district command was taken over by Lieutenant Jerzy Dominik, codenamed Wilnianin.

=== In the Old Town and Śródmieście ===
On 7 August, a reorganization of the battalion took place at Gęsiówka. The commander of the Wola Subdistrict formed a unit from the withdrawing troops under the command of Captain Stefaniak, codenamed Stefan, which was assigned to Radosław Group (where it fought until 10 August in the area of Powązki Cemetery). The remaining units, under the command of Lieutenant Wilnianin, were transferred to the Old Town during the night of 8–9 August, forming two companies. The 1st Company, commanded by Lieutenant Stanisław Lubański, codenamed Wit, remained as the reserve of Północ Group, while the 2nd Company, commanded by Second Lieutenant Eugeniusz Śmieszek, codenamed Sęp (Military Units of the Uprising Emergency), was incorporated into Leśnik Group as the 3rd Wola Company. This company consisted of three platoons, including the 3rd Platoon (formerly 323 Military Units of the Uprising Emergency) led by Senior Firefighter Jan Ostrowski, codenamed Hart. According to Antoni Przygoński, the newly formed units included 200 soldiers, half of whom were armed. Additionally, during the night of 6–7 August, approximately 190 unarmed battalion soldiers were sent to the Old Town, to Długa Street, where they formed the Wola Company (commanded by Platoon Leader Jan Kozłowski, codenamed Iwan) within the 6th Workers' Militia Battalion, performing auxiliary tasks.

The Wola Company took part in the fighting in Muranów, suffering heavy losses. On 10 August, during the battle for the Customs Office building on Inflancka Street, Platoon Commander Senior Firefighter Jan Ostrowski, codenamed Hart, was seriously wounded. Sergeant Jan Jaszczyk, codenamed Nida (former commander of Platoon 333), took over command. Due to casualties, the unit was reorganized into two platoons: Ludwik Platoon (based on the former Platoon 300) and Nida Platoon (based on the former Platoon 323 Military Units of the Uprising Emergency). On the morning of 11 August, Captain Stefan's group, which had been fighting at Powązki Cemetery and the northern part of Okopowa Street, arrived. On 13 August, the company commander, Second Lieutenant Eugeniusz Śmieszek, codenamed Sęp (Military Units of the Uprising Emergency), was wounded. Lieutenant Jerzy Dominik, codenamed Wilnianin, took command of the company, but after his death on 18 August, Captain Stanisław Stefaniak, codenamed Stefan, assumed command.

From 21 August, the company participated in the defense of the Polish Security Printing Works. On 23 August, a group from the former Platoon 323 (Military Units of the Uprising Emergency) from Świętojerska Street, led by Sergeant Władysław Czerwiński, codenamed Stefan (deputy to Hart in Platoon 323), joined the company, assuming the role of company chief. The company was reinforced during the fighting with units from Wola in the Old Town, allowing Nida Platoon to maintain its structure of three squads commanded by Platoon Leader Henryk Gniazdowski (Military Units of the Uprising Emergency), Cadet Corporal Jerzy Mieszkowski, codenamed Myszka (Military Units of the Uprising Emergency), and Cadet Corporal Roman Kossakiewicz, codenamed Kosa (Military Units of the Uprising Emergency). After Sergeant Jan Jaszczyk, codenamed Nida, was killed on 28 August, Sergeant Henryk Gniazdowski, codenamed Ślepowron (Military Units of the Uprising Emergency), took over command of the platoon.

The company covered the evacuation of insurgent units from the Old Town and then, during the night of 1–2 September, a group of several soldiers reached Śródmieście, joining the Stefan Battalion in Second Lieutenant Jaroń's company on the Książęca–Nowy Świat sector.

The last Wola unit soldier to be killed was Cadet Officer Jerzy Mieszkowski, codenamed Myszka (Military Units of the Uprising Emergency), on 19 September. On 20 September, the unit, along with the entire Stefan Battalion, was incorporated into the 72nd Infantry Regiment of the 28th Infantry Division of the Home Army. Following the signing of the capitulation act on 5 October, the unit, as part of the 72nd Regiment, marched out of Warsaw and went into captivity.

=== Decorated soldiers ===
A list of identified soldiers of the battalion:

- Captain Karol Kryński, codenamed Waga (wounded on 3 August, died on 5 August in the Karol and Maria Szlenkier Hospital). Posthumously awarded the Silver Cross of the Virtuti Militari by order number 424 of the commander of the Home Army on 18 September 1944 "for exceptional personal bravery and positive influence on those around him during combat".
- Senior Firefighter Jan Ostrowski, codenamed Hart (seriously wounded on 10 August, died on 17 August). Posthumously awarded the Cross of Valour on 16 August. Posthumously awarded the Silver Cross of the Virtuti Militari by order number 424 of the commander of the Home Army on 18 September 1944 "for courage, initiative, and setting a good example for subordinates". Likely posthumously promoted to the rank of Second Lieutenant.
- Sergeant Edward Adamski, codenamed Czarny (killed on 31 August), posthumously awarded the Cross of Valour and promoted to the rank of Second Lieutenant. Listed in the Warsaw Rising Museum's biographical records as a soldier of the Wola Subdistrict, later serving in the Chrobry I Battalion, in the platoon of Second Lieutenant Wal. His wife, Zofia Adamska, a medic from Platoon 336, was killed on 7 August on Wawelberga Street.
- Sergeant Henryk Gniazdowski, codenamed Ślepowron – awarded the Cross of Valour by order of the commander of the Home Army on 18 August (listed in the order as a member of the Chrobry Battalion under Major Sosna). In the Warsaw Rising Museum records, he appears as a soldier of Platoon 323, later serving in the Leśnik Group, Wola Company, and Osa Company, Platoon 169.
- Corporal Cadet Jerzy Kamiński, codenamed Tur (died on 26 August), awarded the Cross of Valour.
- Corporal Officer Cadet Jerzy Mieszkowski, codenamed Myszka (died on 19 September), awarded the Cross of Valour.

== Bibliography ==
- Bartelski, Lesław (1974). Walki powstańcze na Woli.
- Bartelski, Lesław (1988). Powstanie warszawskie [Warsaw Uprising] (in Polish). Warsaw: Iskry. ISBN 83-207-1034-0.
- Borkiewicz, Adam (1957). Powstanie warszawskie. Zarys działań natury wojskowej [Warsaw Uprising: Outline of Military Actions] (in Polish).
- Kirchmayer, Jerzy (1984). Powstanie Warszawskie [Warsaw Uprising] (in Polish). ISBN 83-05-11-080-X.
- Kulesza, Juliusz (2003). W murach Polskiej Wytwórni Papierów Wartościowych [Within the Walls of the Polish Security Printing Works] (in Polish). Warsaw: Askon. ISBN 83-87545-77-5.
- Maciąg, R. (1974). "Powstanie i struktura organizacyjna GL PPS-WRN na Ochocie i Woli" [The Origin and Organizational Structure of the GL PPS-WRN in Ochota and Wola]. Z lat wojny, okupacji i odbudowy [From the Years of War, Occupation, and Reconstruction] (in Polish). Warsaw: Ministerstwo Obrony Narodowej.
- Podlewski, Stanisław (1989). Wolność krzyżami się mierzy [Freedom Is Measured by Crosses] (in Polish). ISBN 83-7012-017-2.
- Przygoński, A. (1980). Powstanie warszawskie w sierpniu 1944 r. [Warsaw Uprising in August 1944] (in Polish). Warsaw: Państ. Wydaw. Naukowe. ISBN 83-01-00293-X.
- Puchalski, Z. (1971). "Walki powstańcze na Woli w 1944 r." [Insurgent Battles in Wola in 1944]. Rocznik Warszawski [Warsaw Yearbook] (in Polish). Warsaw: State Publishing Institute PIW.
- Rozwadowski, P., ed. (2005). Wielka Ilustrowana Encyklopedia Powstania Warszawskiego [Great Illustrated Encyclopedia of the Warsaw Uprising] (in Polish). ISBN 83-11-09261-3.
