= Błyskawica =

Błyskawica - in Polish: lightning:

- ORP Błyskawica - Polish destroyer
- Błyskawica radiostation
- Błyskawica submachine gun
