= Cezarów =

- Village
- Location within Poland
- Coordinates: 52°14′22″N 21°25′56″E
- Country: Poland
- Voivodeship: Masovian
- County: Mińsk
- Gmina: Dębe Wielkie
- Population: 17
- Website: https://web.archive.org/web/20080916120707/http://www.cezarow.pl/

Cezarów [t͡sɛˈzaruf] is a village in the administrative district of Gmina Dębe Wielkie, within Mińsk County, Masovian Voivodeship, in east-central Poland.
