= Soviet–Polish Non-Aggression Pact =

1932 treaty between Poland and the Soviet Union

Pact of Non-Aggression between Poland and The Union of Soviet Socialist Republics
- Signed: 25 July 1932; 93 years ago
- Location: Moscow
- Signatories: (Second Polish Republic) Stanisław Patek (Soviet Union) Nikolay Krestinsky
- Parties: Poland; Soviet Union
- Language: Polish; Russian

The Soviet–Polish Non-Aggression Pact (Polish: Polsko-radziecki pakt o nieagresji, Russian: Договор о ненападении между СССР и Польшей, transliterated as Dogovor o nenapadenii mezhdu SSSR i Pol'shey) was a non-aggression pact signed in 1932 by representatives of Poland and the Soviet Union. The pact was unilaterally broken on September 17, 1939, by the Soviet invasion of Poland.

== Background ==
After the 1919-1921 Polish–Soviet War, the Polish authorities pursued a policy of "equal distance" between Germany and the Soviet Union. Most Polish politicians on both the left and the right believed that Poland should rely mostly on the crucial 1921 Franco-Polish alliance, which dated back to shortly after the First World War, and should support neither Germany nor the Soviet Union.

To normalize bilateral contacts with the Soviets, talks were started in January 1926 to prepare a non-aggression pact to strengthen the Polish borders that had been established by the 1921 Peace of Riga and to balance it by a similar pact with Germany. However, negotiations with the Germans had not started when those with the Soviet Union were interrupted in June 1927 since the United Kingdom had broken diplomatic relations with the Soviets in May after it found a spy ring, and Soviet Ambassador Pyotr Voykov was assassinated in Warsaw in June. Instead, Poland agreed to the Kellogg-Briand Pact of 1928.

== Signing ==
Soviet-Polish negotiations were resumed in Moscow in 1931. The Soviet-Polish Pact was signed on July 25, 1932, effective for three years. Ratifications were exchanged in Warsaw on December 23, 1932, and the pact went into effect the same day. It was registered in the League of Nations Treaty Series on January 9, 1933.

On May 5, 1934, it was extended without amendment to December 31, 1945.

== Terms ==
Both countries agreed to renounce violence in bilateral relations, resolve their problems through negotiations and forgo any armed conflict or alliance aimed at each other.

== Aftermath ==
The pact was broken by the Soviet Union on September 17, 1939, when it invaded Poland and helped the Germans in accordance with the secret protocols of the Molotov–Ribbentrop Pact.

The Soviet-Polish Pact was considered at the time to be a major success of Polish diplomacy, which had been greatly weakened by the German–Polish customs war, the renouncement of parts of the Treaty of Versailles and the loosened ties with France after it agreed to the Locarno Treaties. The pact also reinforced Poland's negotiating position with Germany, which finally resulted eighteen months later in the signing of the 1934 German–Polish declaration of non-aggression.

== See also ==
- Soviet–Finnish Non-Aggression Pact
- Franco-Soviet Treaty of Mutual Assistance
- German–Polish declaration of non-aggression
- Soviet–Japanese Neutrality Pact
