= Café Adria =

Nightclub in Warsaw

Coordinates: 52°14′05″N 21°00′38″E

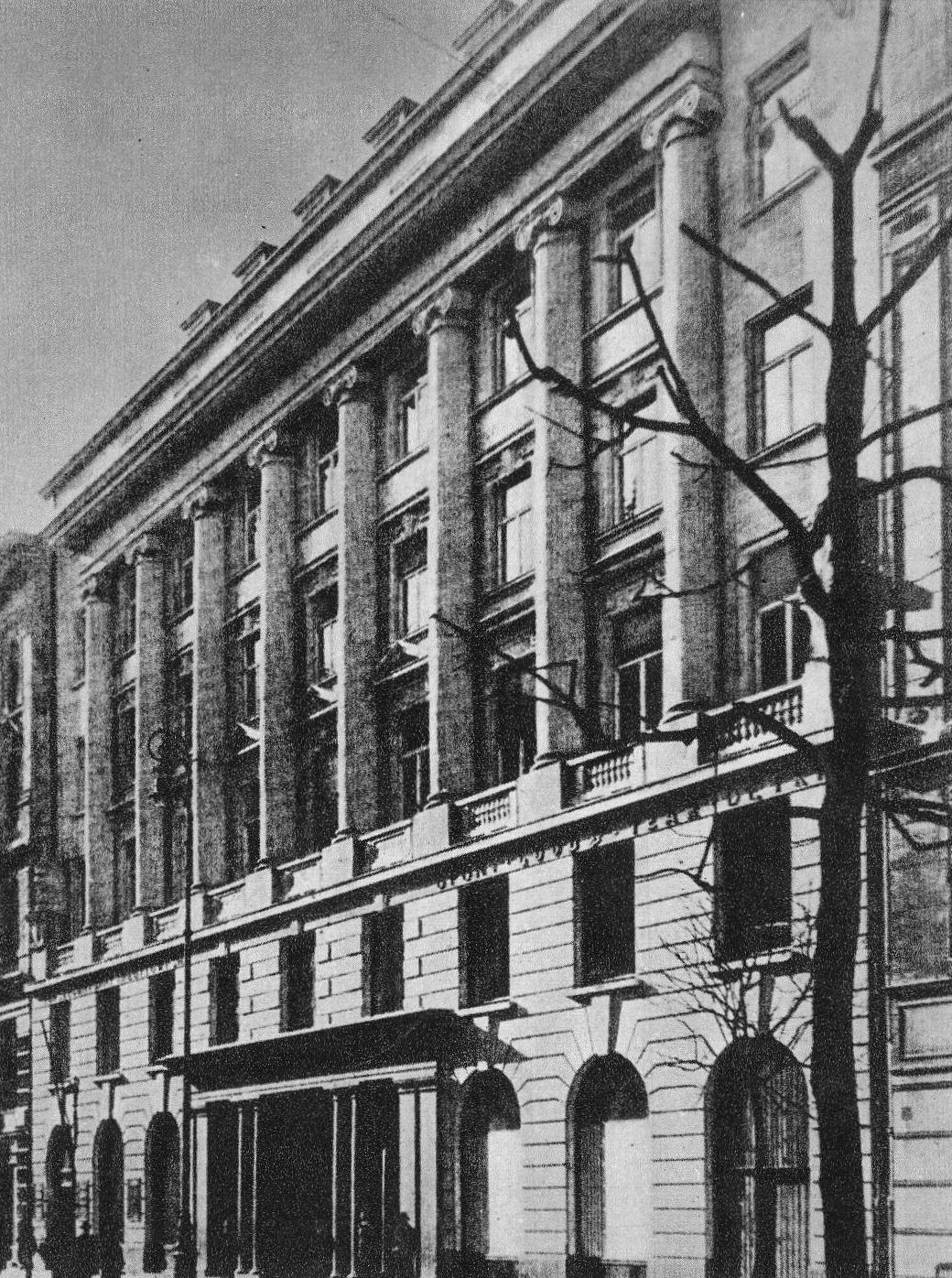
The façade of the building which housed the café. It was built in 1928 for the Italian insurance company, Riunione Adriatica di Sicurtà.

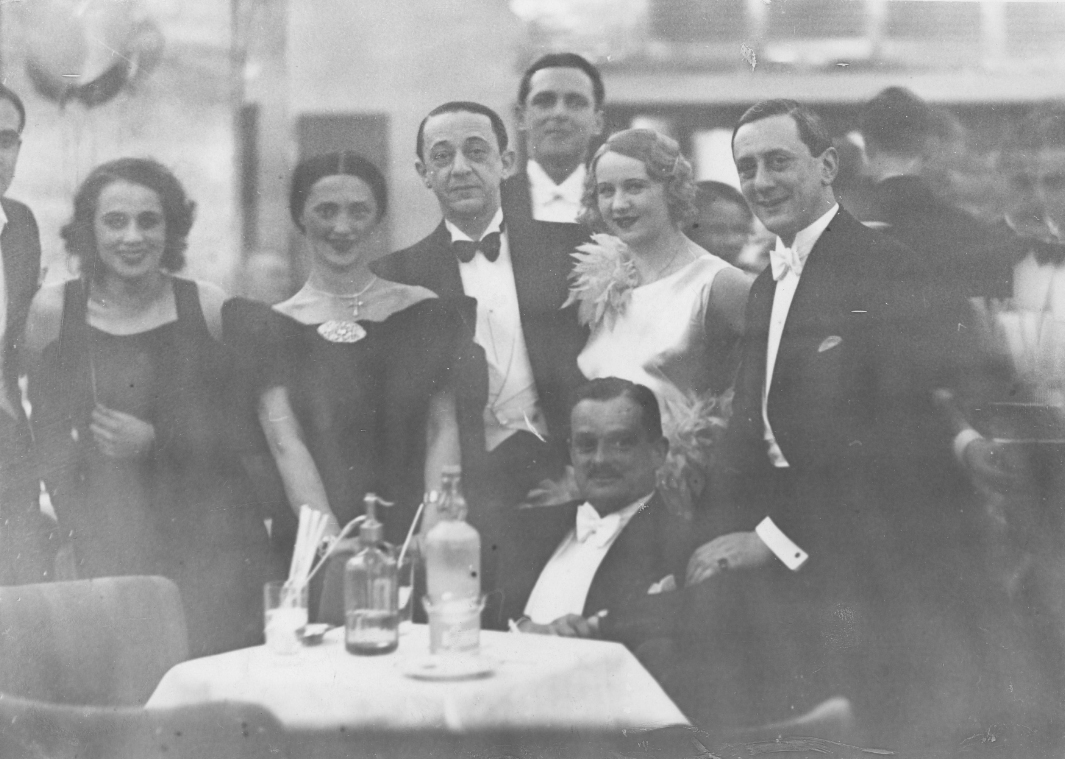
A press ball at the café in 1934. The group includes Zofia Kajzerówna, Janina Martini, Konrad Tom, Aleksander Żabczyński, Alina Żeliska and Fryderyk Jarosy.

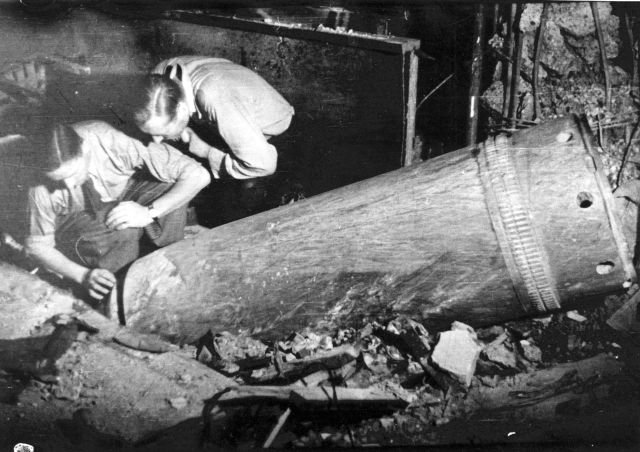
The 60 cm shell from a Karl-Gerät siege mortar that penetrated the building on 18 August 1944

Café Adria was an entertainment complex and nightclub in Warsaw, which included an American bar, café, dance hall, restaurant and winter garden.

It started operating in 1930 and during the 1930s it was also used as a location for filmmaking.

It continued to operate during the Second World War, but this was for the German occupying forces who requisitioned it. It became a base for the Polish Home Army during the Warsaw Uprising, where it was damaged by bombardment.

== Design and operations ==
Café Adria was founded in 1930 at Moniuszki Street 10 by entrepreneur Franciszek Moszkowicz and its restaurant opened in February 1931. It occupied the basement and ground floor of a large office building that had been built in 1928 for the Italian insurance company Riunione Adriatica di Sicurtà, which presumably inspired the café's name.

Its style was Art Deco and used lighting to emphasise the quality of materials, rather than ornamentation. The dance floor included a rubberised disc that revolved like a phonograph turntable and its live band was led by many performers, such as Artur Gold. The American bar was air-conditioned and served cocktails and Coca-Cola. The winter garden contained plants and live birds, such as parrots.

The venue was at the centre of Warsaw nightlife. It hosted events like balls and parties and often featured prominent artists, musicians and other popular figures.

== Filmmaking location ==
The café's varied interiors made it a good location for filmmaking. It has appeared in many films, such as the 1933 movie His Excellency, The Shop Assistant, or the 1934 Polish musical comedy Co mój mąż robi w nocy (What Is My Husband Doing Tonight?), where it was named "Alhambra" and used as a set for half of the scenes.

== Wartime ==
During the Second World War, Café Adria was requisitioned and reserved for Germans only. In May 1943, there was a shootout when Jan Kryst sought revenge for the torture of Polish prisoners by shooting members of the Gestapo who were there for the cabaret.

During the Warsaw Uprising, it housed a canteen and the Błyskawica radiostation. It was then hit by a large shell from a Karl-Gerät siege mortar on 18 August 1944. The 60-centimetre (24 in) shell did not explode, but penetrated all the floors of the building and reached the cellars. Further bombardment then inflicted more damage, but the building was one of the few to remain standing and was renovated as a bank after the war.

== Contemporary use ==
In 1973 another café was created in the same place under the name New Adria, but it closed in 2005 and the building that housed the café was abandoned; in 2024 there were plans to modernise the building for use as residential flats.

The building is now listed on the Polish list of historic monuments.
