= Stefan Aleksander Okrzeja =

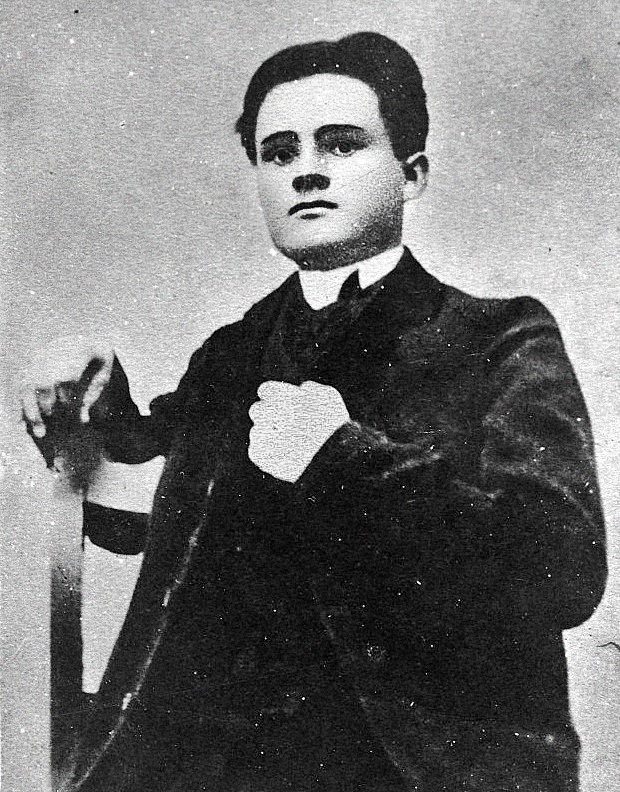
- Stefan Aleksander Okrzeja

Personal details
- Born: 3 April 1886 Dębe Wielkie, Congress Poland
- Died: 21 July 1905 (aged 19) Warsaw, Congress Poland
- Party: Polish Socialist Party
- Occupation: Worker, activist

Stefan Aleksander Okrzeja (Polish pronunciation: [ˈstɛfan alɛˈksandɛr ɔˈkʂɛja]; born 3 April 1886 in Dębe Wielkie, Mińsk County, executed 21 July 1905 in Warsaw) was a Polish worker, socialist and activist for Poland's independence.

== Early life and activism ==
Stefan Okrzeja was a son of a railway track walker. He worked as a painter, then as an iron worker in various factories in Warsaw. He joined the illegal Polish Socialist Party (PPS) in 1904, soon becoming a member of its Warsaw Committee. He took part in many anti-tsarist demonstrations. During the famous demonstration on Grzybowski Square on 13 November 1904, he was the one who carried the red banner. He became a key member of the Combat Organization of the Polish Socialist Party that was responsible for protecting workers meetings and demonstrations and was organizing attacks against Russian police officers or high rank officials. Okrzeja distinguished himself in many combat actions as a commander of a party composed of ten fighters.

== Last action, trial and execution ==
On 26 March 1905, Okrzeja made an attempt to assassinate a police officer. He threw a bomb into the police post on Wileńska Street in Praga. The explosion demolished the post, but Okrzeja was within the range. Badly wounded and unable to escape, he was arrested and imprisoned in the infamous 10th Pavilion of Warsaw Citadel. According to the fact he was caught red-handed, the trial before a district court was very short, despite the passionate defence by Stanisław Patek. Okrzeja was sentenced to death and executed soon afterwards, on 21 July 1905.

== Legacy ==
By his deeds and martyrdom, Stefan Okrzeja became a hero of Polish Socialist Party and an icon of its fight for independent Poland and workers rights. Writer Gustaw Daniłowski wrote a short story about his life. It was first published by the underground PPS printing house. When Poland regained its independence in 1918, Okrzeja was counted into a pantheon of national heroes. His name was given to the 28th Infantry Division and the 3rd Battalion of the Military Units of the Uprising Emergency of Socialists, as well as to a street in Praga, not far away from the place of his last combat action.
