= Jan Kryst =

Polish scout and member of Polish anti-Nazi resistance

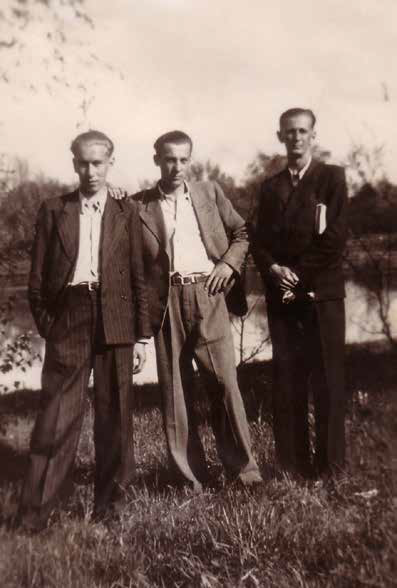
- Jan Kryst (at right)
- Born: 6 April 1922; Modlin, Second Polish Republic
- Died: 22 May 1943 (aged 21); Warsaw, German-occupied Poland
- Military career
- Allegiance: Second Polish Republic; Polish Underground State
- Branch: Home Army
- Service years: 1939–1943
- Nickname: Alan
- Conflicts: World War II; Invasion of Poland; Polish resistance movement in World War II †

Jan Kryst (6 April 1922 – 22 May 1943) was a Polish scout and a member of the Polish anti-Nazi resistance. He fought for the Home Army and volunteered for a revenge attack at the Café Adria where he fatally shot several members of the Gestapo before being killed himself.

== Biography ==
Kryst was born in Modlin, Poland, and raised in Warsaw's Wola district. His father was a worker and a member of the Fighting Organization of the Polish Socialist Party. Kryst graduated from a technical school before the war. He was also a member of the Polish Scouting Association.

In September 1939, Kryst participated as a volunteer in the defense of Warsaw. During the German occupation, he joined the Home Army (AK) as a soldier of the Wola Subdistrict, and was a member of 304 platoon. In 1943, he learned that he would soon die of pulmonary tuberculosis, which he had been suffering from for a long time. In view of this, he approached Captain Jerzy Antoni Lewiński "Chuchro" – the commander of the Warsaw District Kedyw – with a request to order an action for him, even one in which he would have no chance of survival.

"Chuchro" ordered Kryst to carry out an assassination on 22 May on Gestapo officers at the Café Adria, on Moniuszki Street 10, which was restricted to Germans. At the time, the Kedyw in Warsaw was carrying out a series of assassinations of German Gestapo and SS henchmen in revenge for the torture of Polish prisoners. On the same day, another Kedyw fighter, Andrzej Góral "Tomasz", carried out a successful assassination on Ewald Lange in front of the Apollo cinema on Three Crosses Square.

Kryst arrived at the restaurant in the evening around 7:00 p.m. Two Home Army men were there for the purpose of covering his retreat: Jerzy Tabęcki "Lasso" and anonymous "Blondyn". When the lights in the room went out before the musical performance, Kryst fired at five Gestapo officers sitting at one table. He then retreated toward the exit while shooting at the surrounding Germans. One of them came up behind him and hit him in the back with a chair. Kryst lost his balance and was lynched by the Germans.

More Gestapo arrived on the scene and held the Polish employees of Adria hostage until 5 a.m. After a brief investigation, Kryst was recognized as a Jewish fugitive from the ghetto. No direct repression was undertaken, although historian Wojciech Königsberg mentions that Kryst's friend Stanisław Czarnota was arrested in direct relation to the Adria assault.

The AK later reported that Kryst managed to kill a captain and two Gestapo lieutenants. According to a German memo, two Gestapo officials, a corporal and a wounded SS man were shot dead. In 2023, historian Wojciech Königsberg established the names of the Germans killed by Kryst. They were Kriegsverwaltungs-Inspektor (War Administration Inspector) Karl Thüring (born 6 December 1904 in Wiesbaden), Zahlmeister (Paymaster) Heinz Grünberg (born 10 July 1902 in Magdeburg) and Obergefreiter (Senior Corporal) of Artillery Josef Kohlbauer (born 31 July 1921 in Munich). SS-Hauptsturmführer (Captain) Otto Söldner (born 4 June 1895 in Neukenroth) died in Germany several weeks later, on 9 July 1943, as a result of the wounds he had sustained.

== Commemoration ==
Jan Kryst's action was made public by the Polish Underground. In the "Information Bulletin" the following information appeared:

The Directorate of Underground Fighting did not use a bomb – this was not about killing just any Germans. It was about finding only Gestapo men from among the crowd of visitors and executing them. The man who undertook this task knew that he would not get out of a place full of military Germans alive. In the pocket of his clothes he carried a letter stating the reasons for the action and threatening increased reprisals if the Gestapo's bestialities did not cease. This fighter, going in full consciousness to his own death, was – Jan Kryst, a locksmith.

— "Information Bulletin", 23 June 1943

In 1943, the Bureau of Information and Propaganda of the Home Army Headquarters published a book by Sławomir Dunin-Borkowski, entitled Polska karząca (lit. 'Punishing Poland'), which was dedicated to Kryst. During the Warsaw Uprising on 8 August 1944, a plaque was unveiled in Adria dedicated to "Alan". In 1961, one of the streets in Warsaw's Wola district was named after Jan Kryst. In 1995, a plaque commemorating Kryst's action was unveiled on the building that used to house Café Adria.

The émigré poet Kazimierz Wierzyński mentioned Kryst in his poem dedicated to the dissolution of the Home Army:

Za mosty wysadzone z ręki robotniczej –
Węszyć gdzie kto się ukrył, psy spuścić ze smyczy.
Za wyroki na katów, za celny strzał Krysta –
Jeden wyrok: do tiurmy. Dla wszystkich. Do czysta!
Za Warszawę, Warszawę, powstańcze zachcianki –
Specjalny odział śledczy: „przyłożyć do ścianki”.

— Kazimierz Wierzyński: Na rozwiązanie Armii Krajowej
Translation:

For bridges blown up by workers' hands –
Sniff out who is hiding, unleash the dogs.
For sentences on the executioners, for Kryst's precise shot –
One verdict: to prison. For everyone. For all!
For Warsaw, Warsaw, insurgent whims –
A special investigative unit: 'line them up against the wall'.

— On the dissolution of the Home Army

== Bibliography ==
- Königsberg, Wojciech (2023). "Akcja w Café Adria" (PDF). Biblioteka Polska Zbrojna Historia. 1.
- Strzembosz, Tomasz (1983). Akcje zbrojne podziemnej Warszawy 1939-1944 [Armed actions of underground Warsaw 1939-1944] (in Polish). Warsaw.
