= Dębe Wielkie, Mińsk County =

Dębe Wielkie
- Village
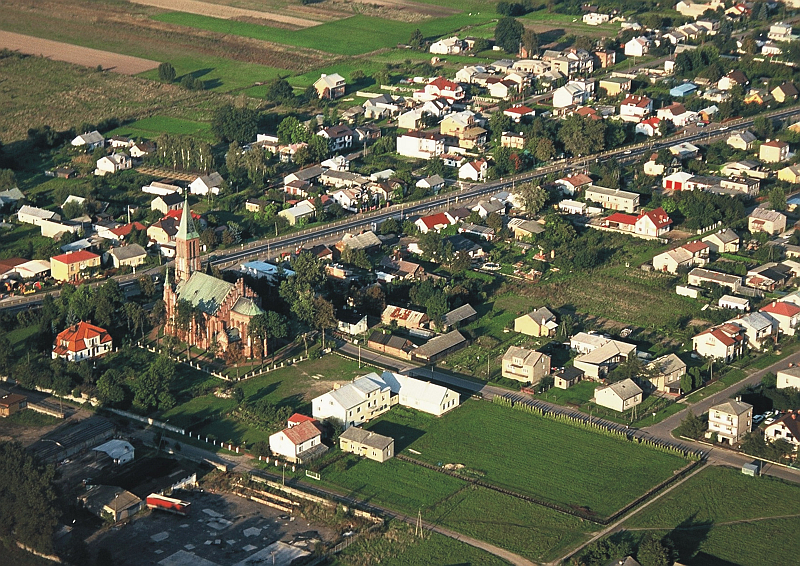
- Aerial view

- Coat of arms

- Location within Poland
- Coordinates: 52°11′59″N 21°27′1″E
- Country: Poland
- Voivodeship: Masovian
- County: Mińsk
- Gmina: Dębe Wielkie
- Population: 2,750

Dębe Wielkie [ˈdɛmbɛ ˈvjɛlkʲɛ] is a village in Mińsk County, Masovian Voivodeship, in east-central Poland. It is the seat of the gmina (administrative district) called Gmina Dębe Wielkie.

The village is the birthplace of Polish socialist revolutionary Stefan Okrzeja.
