= Cięciwa, Mińsk County =

Cięciwa
- Village
- Location within Poland
- Coordinates: 52°14′N 21°26′E
- Country: Poland
- Voivodeship: Masovian
- County: Mińsk
- Gmina: Dębe Wielkie
- Population: 48

Cięciwa [t͡ɕɛnˈt͡ɕiva] is a village in the administrative district of Gmina Dębe Wielkie, within Mińsk County, Masovian Voivodeship, in east-central Poland.
