= John Ward (RAF officer) =

British airman

John George Ward
- Born: John George Ward; 15 December 1918; Kings Norton, Birmingham
- Died: 29 August 1995 (aged 76); South West London
- Military career
- Allegiance: United Kingdom
- Branch: Royal Air Force
- Service years: 1937–47
- Rank: Flight Lieutenant
- Service number: 542939
- Units: No. 226 Squadron RAF; Polish Home Army
- Conflicts: Second World War
- Awards: Military Cross; Krzyż Walecznych

Polish Radio broadcast in English
A news programme on the daily fights in Warsaw, featuring the voice of John Ward

John Ward, MC, (15 December 1918 – 29 August 1995) was a Royal Air Force Flight Lieutenant who was twice decorated for bravery. In World War II he was a member of the crew of a bomber that was shot down. He was taken POW, but escaped, and joined up with the Polish Armia Krajowa ("Home Army").

Ward became a clandestine journalist in occupied Poland. He founded and edited a Polish underground newspaper, was a war correspondent for The Times, translated transcripts of BBC broadcasts into Polish for the Home Army, built radio transceivers, and trained Home Army radio operators. In 1944 he served with the Home Army in the Warsaw Uprising, in which he was wounded in combat against German forces.

At the end of the War, the Red Army captured Ward, but he escaped and was repatriated to Britain. He resumed his RAF career, and was commissioned as an officer.

== Early life ==
Ward was born in December 1918 the Kings Norton district of Birmingham and grew up in the nearby suburb of Ward End where he was educated at the local council school.

== Royal Air Force service ==
He joined the Royal Air Force (RAF) in 1937 aged 18, as an Aircraftman 2nd class, to train for aircrew as a wireless operator/air gunner and by 1939 was serving with No. 226 Squadron RAF based at RAF Upper Heyford. On 2 September 1939 the squadron was part of the RAF contingent which moved to France ready for war. Under the Advanced Air Striking Force it was based at Rheims.

=== Prisoner of war ===
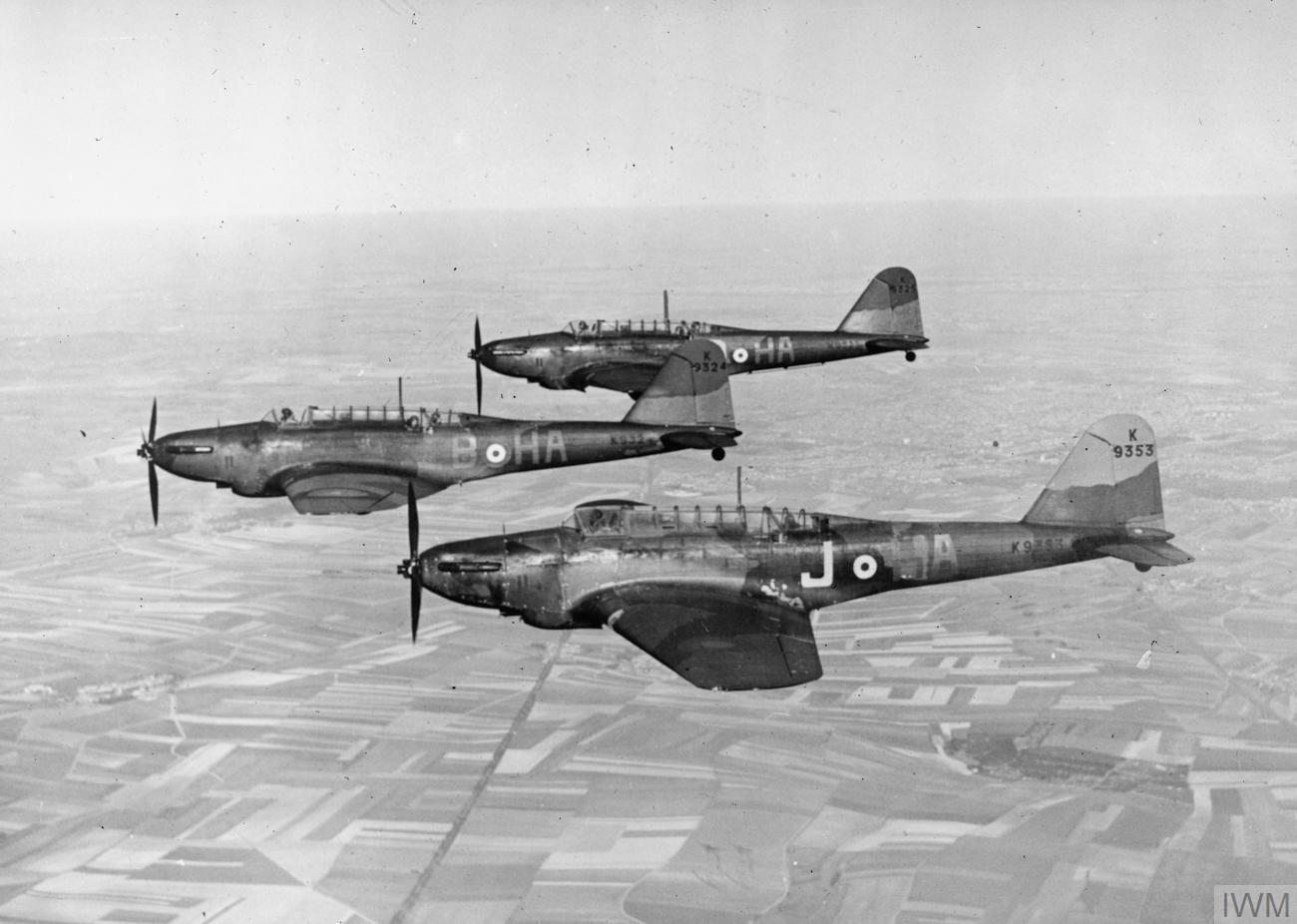
RAF Fairey Battle light bombers over France, 1940

Ward was an Aircraftman 1st class and member of the crew of a No. 226 Squadron RAF Fairey Battle light bomber (serial number "K9183") on 10 May 1940 when it was shot down by the Luftwaffe during the Battle of France.

Tasked to bomb German troop convoys as they advanced south-west of Luxemburg, four aircraft from the squadron took off at 17:00 hours GMT from Rheims, Champagne. After locating a column of 30 to 40 vehicles they made several dive bombing attacks in the face of heavy defensive fire. They suffered one aircraft shot down in flames (K9183) and another which crashed after being badly shot up. All three crew of Ward's crew were taken prisoner wounded, although the fatally injured pilot died three days later.

Ward was captured and held as a prisoner of war. He was at Stalag Luft I near Barth, Western Pomerania in December 1940 before being moved to an unnamed labour camp in Upper Silesia in January 1941. At the end of March 1941 he was sent to a labour camp near Lissa in Poland.

=== Escape and the Polish resistance ===
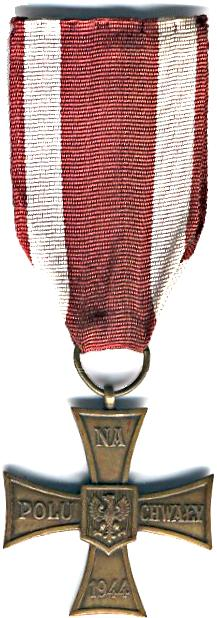
On 17 April 1941, Ward was with a working party of twenty prisoners supervised by two German soldiers when he hid, changed into civilian clothes and escaped. At Gostyn he was arrested in the railway marshalling yards and taken to the police station where he escaped through a window at night. In six days Ward travelled to Sieradz where he was directed to the local Roman Catholic priest who provided an introduction to the Home Army. On 30 April 1941, he was taken by train to Łódź. At the end of May Ward was taken by bus to Warsaw. The plan had been to get Ward across the border to the Soviet Union but when the Germans invaded it in June 1941 that became impractical. Ward met Otto Gordzialowski, a lawyer who ran an underground newspaper called Dzien, and worked for him transcribing British Broadcasting Company (BBC) radio broadcasts for translation into Polish for the newspaper. In September 1941, the Gestapo located the newspaper and captured the printers and distributors but failed to catch Gordzialowski or Ward. In 1942 Ward began to build wireless receivers and transmitters which were supplied to Polish resistance groups. In June 1942, he opened his own newspaper, the Echo, and after building it up passed it to the ZWZ organisation in February 1943. In this period he trained a number of Poles as radio operators.

Operating with the Polish resistance, he was tasked with facilitating communication between the British government and the Polish underground. From 1941 to 1945 Ward was the communications liaison between the British government and the Home Army; he also worked as a war correspondent for The Times of London, including over two years in occupied Warsaw.

=== Warsaw uprising ===
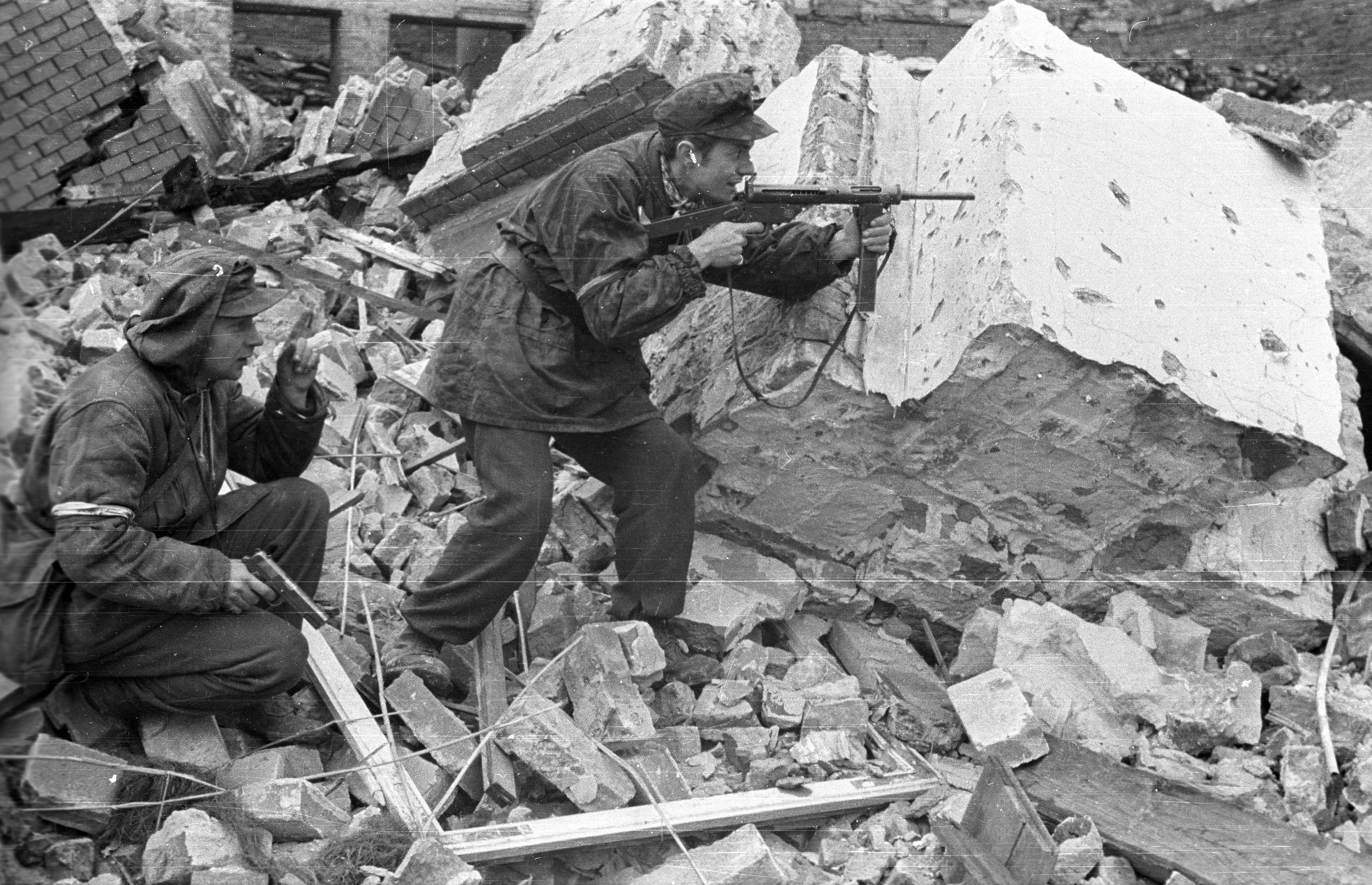
Home Army soldiers fighting on Kredytowa-Królewska Street, 3 October 1944

He joined the Polish Resistance in August 1944 when the Warsaw Uprising broke out and was recruited by Stefan and Zofia Korbonski to prepare English dispatches that were transmitted to London via Morse Code. He prepared 64 eyewitness reports of the fighting as a war correspondent (behind enemy lines) for The Times. Ward participated in the clandestine activities of the Polish resistance movement's Błyskawica ("Lighting") radio station during the uprising, airing the English-language broadcasts, as well as contributing more than 100 reports. He spoke Polish with a heavy accent. Despite the risk of execution if he was captured Ward wore the red and white armband and the Polish cap eagle of the Home Army. He was wounded in action in the thigh by mortar shrapnel; the Polish force decorated him with the Cross of Valour for his bravery, awarded personally by General Tadeusz Bór-Komorowski.

Ward fought alongside the Polish resistance after the uprising until the end of the war and continued to be promoted by the Royal Air Force on a regular basis achieving the rank of Warrant Officer. Ward was promoted to commissioned rank in the Home Army and General Bór-Komorowski arranged for his movement from Warsaw to Kielce for evacuation by air as the uprising ended on 4 October 1944 with the Home Army survivors going into German captivity. He maintained contact with Major Michael Pickles, the Head of SOE Polish Section.

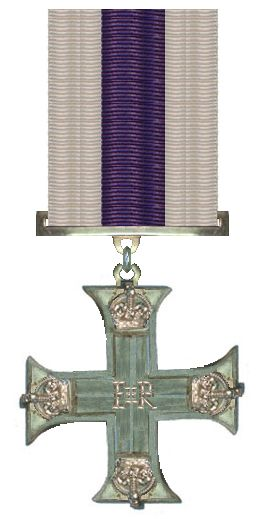

=== After the uprising ===
Ward left Warsaw heading for Częstochowa and Kielce but his train was stopped by German police and posing as a Pole he was sent back to Czestochowa labour concentration camp. Ward escaped from Czestochowa with help from a German guard bribed with US dollars and joined the 7th Polish Partisan Division serving with them until December 1944. He travelled to Raszków and avoided the initial wave of Soviet Red Army troops who committed serious atrocities on the Polish civil population on 18 January 1945, arresting all educated Poles and anyone suspected of being with the Home Army. On 20 January 1945, a Soviet NKVD Secret Police officer questioned Ward having learned that he was English. He was ordered not to move but on 1 February 1945 with Mrs Gordzialowski he travelled to Kielce where he sent a radio message to London and then continued on to Podkowa Leśna where he contacted General Leopold Okulicki "Kobra" (Cobra), then head of the Home Army. Ward returned to Warsaw on 5 March 1945 and reported to the Soviet occupation commandant but was immediately arrested, interrogated and put in a cell. On the morning of 6 March 1945 Ward left his cell pretending to be an official and after speaking to the guard in fluent Russian, walked away. Some Frenchmen directed him to a US captain who helped him. Ward joined a party of British and US former prisoners of war for repatriation, bound for Odessa. He left there on the troopship Duchess of Bedford on 14 March 1945.

For his continued bravery serving with the Home Army he was awarded the Military Cross, and the Krzyż Walecznych ("Cross of Valour"). His detailed despatches are available online.

== Post-war ==
Ward was commissioned as a Pilot Officer in the Administration and Special Duties Branch of the Royal Air Force on 1 January 1946, and on 1 July 1946 was promoted to Flying Officer. He was promoted Flying Officer on 1 November 1947.

He died on 29 August 1995 in London.

== Awards ==
- Military Cross awarded on 31 August 1945 as Warrant Officer (service number 542939) Royal Air Force formerly of No. 226 Squadron RAF.
- Krzyż Walecznych Polish Cross of Valour.

== See also ==
- Błyskawica radiostation

== Bibliography ==
- Borowiec, Andrew (2015). Warsaw Boy: A Memoir of a Wartime Childhood. Penguin. ISBN 978-0241964033.
- Bór-Komorowski, Tadeusz (2010). The Secret Army. Frontline Books. ISBN 978-1848325951.
- Chorley, William R. (1992). RAF Bomber Command Losses, Volume 1. Midland Counties. ISBN 0-904597-87-3.
- Dallas, Gregor (2005). 1945: The War that Never Ended. Yale University Press. ISBN 978-0300109801.
- Davies, Norman (2004). Rising '44: The Battle for Warsaw. Yale University Press. ASIN B00DJFO17Q.
- Franks, Norman (1994). Valiant Wings. Crecy Books. ISBN 0-947554-49-1.
- Hanson, Joanna (1982). The Civilian Population and the Warsaw Uprising. Cambridge Press. ISBN 978-0521234214.
- Walker, Jonathan (2010). Poland Alone: Britain, SOE and the Collapse of the Polish Resistance, 1944. History Press. ISBN 978-0752457017.
- Williamson, David G. (2012). The Polish Underground 1939-47. Pen & Sword. ISBN 978-1848842816.
