= Łaszczyzna =

- Village
- Location within Poland
- Coordinates: 52°13′13″N 21°26′45″E
- Country: Poland
- Voivodeship: Masovian
- County: Mińsk
- Gmina: Dębe Wielkie

Łaszczyzna [waʂˈt͡ʂɨzna] is a village in the administrative district of Gmina Dębe Wielkie, within Mińsk County, Masovian Voivodeship, in east-central Poland.
