= Aleksandrówka, Mińsk County =

Aleksandrówka
- Village
- Location within Poland
- Coordinates: 52°12′N 21°25′E
- Country: Poland
- Voivodeship: Masovian
- County: Mińsk
- Gmina: Dębe Wielkie
- Population: 442

Aleksandrówka [alɛksanˈdrufka] is a village in the administrative district of Gmina Dębe Wielkie, within Mińsk County, Masovian Voivodeship, in east-central Poland.
