= Rysie, Mińsk County =

Rysie
- Village
- Location within Poland
- Coordinates: 52°13′N 21°28′E
- Country: Poland
- Voivodeship: Masovian
- County: Mińsk
- Gmina: Dębe Wielkie

Rysie [ˈrɨɕɛ] is a village in the administrative district of Gmina Dębe Wielkie, within Mińsk County, Masovian Voivodeship, in east-central Poland.
