= Wola Subdistrict (Home Army) =

Previous army command

The flag of the Home Army

The Wola Subdistrict was a command of the Home Army's Warsaw District which was active during World War II. Under the command of Lieutenant-Colonel Jan Tarnowski, Home Army units from the subdistrict fought against German-led Axis forces in the 1944 Warsaw Uprising. They fought in the Wola neighbourhood of Warsaw from 1 to 6 August 1944, when Axis units forced them to retreat to the Old Town, Śródmieście and the Kampinos Forest. During their engagements with Home Army fighters from the subdistrict, troops from the SS-Sonderregiment Dirlewanger and Police Group Posen committed the Wola massacre, killing up to 50,000 Polish civilians. A notable fighter from the subdistrict was Jan Kryst.

== Organisational structure ==
The Wola Subdistrict included the following Home Army units:

- Region I - commanded by Lieutenant Stanisław Gawryszewski (pseudonym "Balbo-Wieczorek").
  - 1st Company - commanded by Lieutenant Kazimierz Wierzbicki (pseudonym: "Stanisław").
  - 2nd Company - commanded by Lieutenant Kazimierz Młodnicki (pseudonym: "Mata").
- Region II – commanded by Lieutenant Stanisław Lubański (pseudonym: "Wit").
  - 1st Company - commanded by Second lieutenant Władysław Kulasek (pseudonym: "Jaśmin").
  - 2nd Company - commanded by Second lieutenant Aleksander Połoński (pseudonym: "Gromada").
  - 3rd Company - commanded by Second lieutenant Romuald Podwysocki (pseudonym: "Ostoja").
  - 4th Company - commanded by Second lieutenant with unknown name (pseudonym: "Prus").
- Region III – commanded by Captain Karol Kryński (pseudonym: "Waga").

== Military service ==
The place of concentration of the Region I on 1 August was Górce-Blizne. Units could not take weapon stored in the area of Ulrich gardens, because one day earlier German tanks had arrived there. Soldiers passed through to the Kampinos Forest, received weapon there and were included into the Kampinos Group. In the attack from Żoliborz to the Warsaw Gdańsk Station the units suffered losses up to 80% of their number. Those who survived, were included into the Żaglowiec Grouping and continued to fight until the moment of the capitulation of Żoliborz on 30 September 1944.

In the Region II, the 1st company of second lieutenant "Jaśmin" was assigned the task to seize the petroleum factory in Koło. The attack was recalled because engineer units failed to destroy the wall fence. After retreat from the area of the streets: Obozowa/Wawryszewska/Świętego Stanisława and upon a reconnaissance of the situation, the company was assigned the task to erect and to man the barricades in the intersections of streets: Obozowa / Młynarska, Górczewska / Działdowska and Wolska / Działdowska.

On the night of 3 August 1944, fighters from the 1st Company were sent to a Jewish cemetery in Wola to receive Allied air drops. In the afternoon of 5 August, the unit withdrew to Gibalskiego street. On 6 August the company moved to the Old Town and took a section of Brzozowa street from Kamienne Schodki up to Mostowa street. It was undertaken an unsuccessful and hard-fought attack on the Warsaw Gdańsk Station. After working its way to Śródmieście the company defended a section of Widok street as well as a barricade on the crossing of Bracka / Aleje Jerozolimskie streets.

The 2nd company of second lieutenant "Gromada" ought to have seized a school building in Górczewska street. Because of heavy fire of the enemy it was forced to withdraw to the area of Wawrzyszewska / Obozowa streets crossing, where it manned a defensive positions extending up to Ostroroga street. On 4 August the unit withdrew to the area of Protestant cemetery; on 5 August to Kercelak and then it moved to the Old Town. The unit took part in fights in Stawki Street and in the attack on the Warsaw Gdańsk Station. Having retreated to Śródmieście it defended Książęca street.

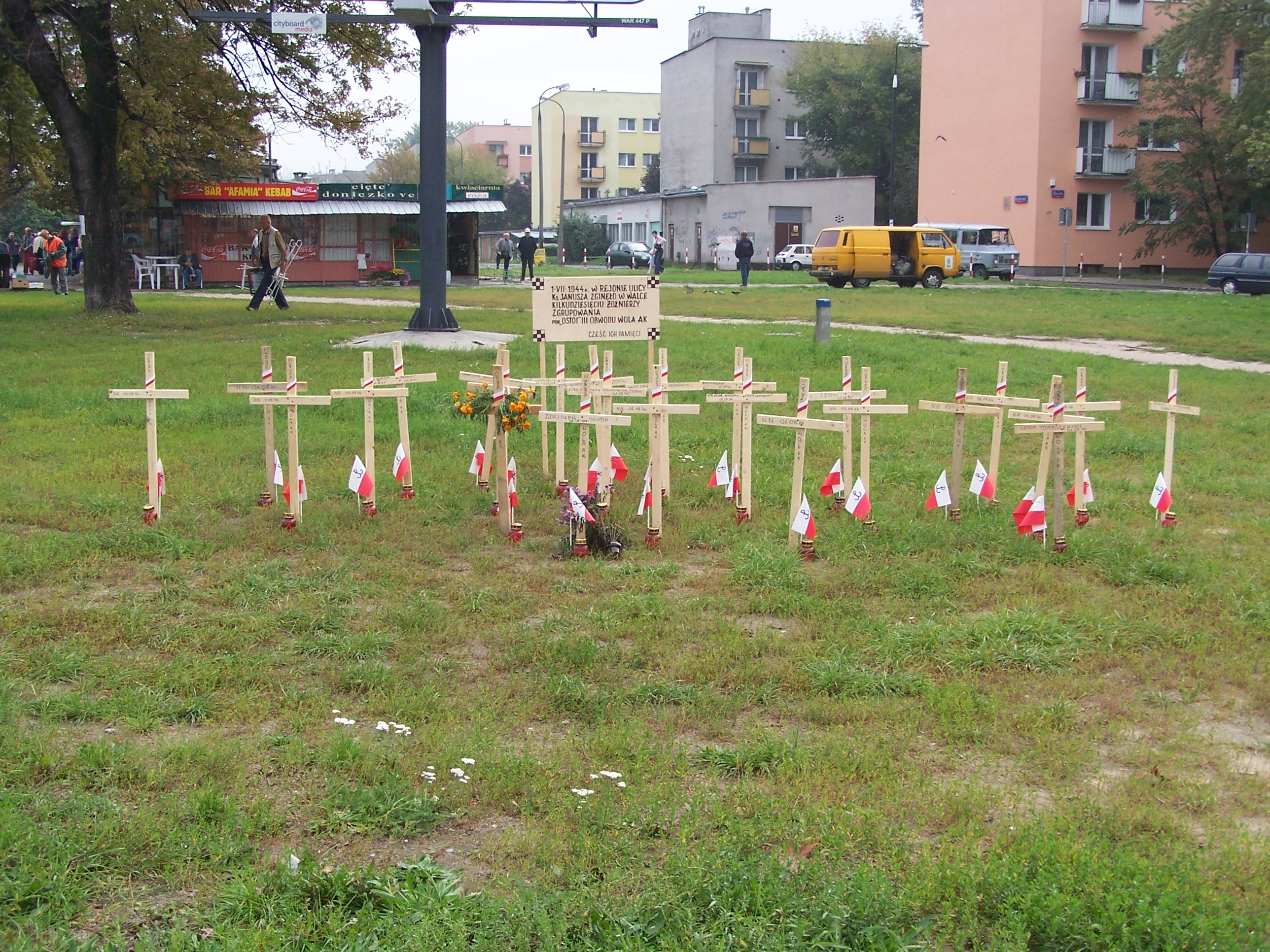
Crosses to commemorate the fallen of the 3rd company of sec. lieutenant "Ostoja"

The 3rd company of Sec. Lieutenant "Ostoja" was assigned the task to bar the road to Warsaw from the direction of Ulrichów against Germans. The platoon commanded by sec. lieutenant Franciszek Potocki pseudonym "Laos" set about executing the task. The enemy had manned a viaduct and mastered the neighbourhood by conducting fire from guard towers placed along the railway line. The attack collapsed. There were many wounded and 15 killed. The platoon of officer cadet Marian Lewandowski pseudonym "Ryś", armed with hand-grenades only, seized the caserns in a school in Gostyńska street and manned barricades in Górczewska / Płocka streets crossing and at the hospital in Płocka street. In the course of heavy fight an enemy tank was destroyed and many pieces of weapon were seized. On 4 August the unit withdrew to Górczewska / Działdowska street crossing, and then to Grzybowska and Mariańska streets, where insurgents who were withdrawing from Wola, were gathering. The Wola units were organised into the Józef Sowiński Bataillon, which fought in streets of Komitetowa, Pańska, Ceglana / Żelazna crossing, Grzybowska, on the area of the Norblin Factory and the Haberbusch Brewery. The assigned area was kept on until the end of the Warsaw Uprising.

Units of the Region III after short fight in Karolkowa and Dworska streets withdrew to Śródmieście and to the Old Town, where they took part in fights conducted by various units until the end of the uprising.

== See also ==
- Wola Massacre
- Military description of the Warsaw Uprising

== Bibliography ==
- Struktura Organizacyjna Armii Krajowej, Marek Ney-Krwawicz w: Mówią wieki nr 9/1986.
- Königsberg, Wojciech (2023). "Akcja w Café Adria" (PDF). Biblioteka Polska Zbrojna Historia. 1.
