= Poręby, Mińsk County =

Poręby
- Village
- Location within Poland
- Coordinates: 52°14′15″N 21°27′45″E
- Country: Poland
- Voivodeship: Masovian
- County: Mińsk
- Gmina: Dębe Wielkie
- Population: 120

Poręby [pɔˈrɛmbɨ] is a village in the administrative district of Gmina Dębe Wielkie, within Mińsk County, Masovian Voivodeship, in east-central Poland.
