= Stanisław Patek =

Polish lawyer, freemason and diplomat

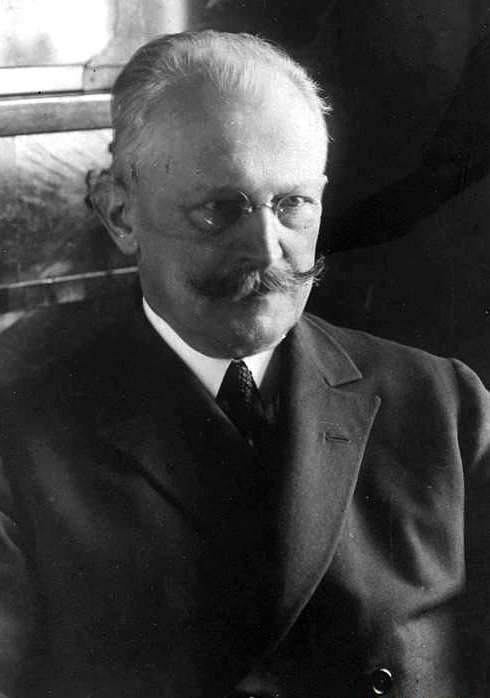
Stanisław Patek.

Stanisław Jan Patek (Polish pronunciation: [staˈɲiswaf ˈpatɛk]; 1 May 1866 – 25 August 1944), Polish lawyer, freemason and diplomat, served as Polish Minister of Foreign Affairs from 1919 to 1920.

== The lawyer ==
Born in Rusinów, he was an activist of the Polish Socialist Party who began his career as an attorney in 1894 in Warsaw, Russian partition (Congress Poland). From 1903 he became involved in legal assistance for political prisoners, and since defended many Poles accused for political dissident as well as members of Combat Organization of the Polish Socialist Party before the Russian courts in Russian partitioned Poland (particularly in the Warsaw Citadel). Founder and activist of Polish legal association grouping like-minded lawyers (Koło Obrońców Politycznych - The Circle of Political Defenders) as well as of other organizations dedicated to helping political prisoners (Ogólna Kasa Pomocy dla Więźniów Politycznych (General Bank for Helping Political Prisoners), Związek Pomocy dla Ofiar Politycznych (Association of Help for Political Repression Victims); those organizations would be headquartered in his legal offices. In the years 1905-1907 the lawyers of Koło took part in about 260 trials; over 20% were found innocent. During that period he met his future partner, Stefania Sempołowska, a semi-official secretary and counselor of the Koło. He was the personal defender of such high-profile defendants as Stefan Aleksander Okrzeja and Józef Montwiłł-Mirecki, and gained the reputation as an excellent orator and lawyer. He gained such a reputation, and skills, that government provocateurs and agents he liked to call for witness commonly made mistakes in their testimonies. He didn't hesitate to criticize the existing political situation, and discuss the common repressions and brutality of tsar's police. In his famous speech during Okrzeja's trial he said:

I do not ask you, Sirs, to consider the mitigating circumstances, I demand it in the name of the law! I have the right to state that justice has not yet became merciless, I have the right to think that judges - even in a military field tribunal - are human, who have a strict code of laws in their hand, but also a beating heart, I have the right to demand that this case be studied by them, analyzed and judged in the minutest details, which show the fault not only with the defendant. So - I demand! I demand in the name of truth...

The organizations defending political prisoners had an unclear legal status in Russian Empire, and were repressed by the government. Due to his activities, as the leading Polish lawyer with an unmatched track of getting his defendants out of the death penalty, and often out from prison altogether, Patek became increasingly inconvenient to the Russian government, and became a target for repressions himself; in 1908 he was accused of "ties with the defendants" (indeed, for a time, even Józef Piłsudski, the future leader of Poland, was hiding in Patek's house); Patek was arrested and briefly imprisoned for a month, but after an intervention by several known Polish and even Russian lawyers, he was released. In 1910 he was subject to another disciplinary hearing for "usage of improper terms during the trials", "conspiracy to change statements", "membership in secret illegal organizations"; he was declared innocent by a regional court, only to have the prosecution open another case against him or appeal against the verdict. Finally, in 1911, despite protests from lawyers from Poland and Russia, he was dropped from the list of the attorneys in Russian Empire; as contemporary Russian newspaper Zvezda put it, "due to political considerations".

After Poland regained independence in 1918, in recognition of his status as one of the most outstanding Polish lawyers, he was involved in the creation of new Polish legal system. In November 1918 he became the President of the Criminal Division of the Appellate Court in Warsaw, and was soon appointed a Judge of the Supreme Court.

== The diplomat ==
Member of the Polish National Committee in Paris as one of the Piłsudski's representatives and Polish delegation at the Treaty of Versailles. Polish Minister of Foreign Affairs (16 December 1919 - 9 June 1920). From 1921 to 1926, Polish envoy to Tokyo, Japan. From 1926 to 1932 envoy to Moscow, Soviet Union, where he negotiated for the Soviet-Polish Non-Aggression Pact. From 1933-1935 ambassador in Washington, United States. Returned to Poland due to illness, senator of Poland, nominated by the president, from 1936 to 1939. A member of the Parliamentary Commission on Foreign Affairs, he was critical of Polish Foreign Minister Józef Beck.

== Last years ==
After the German invasion of Poland, he was involved in protecting the Polish Jews. He died on 25 August 1944, in a hospital in Warsaw, during the Warsaw Uprising, as a result of injuries sustained on 22 August in an explosion of a Luftwaffe bomb.
