= Walercin =

- Village
- Location within Poland
- Coordinates: 52°16′N 21°29′E
- Country: Poland
- Voivodeship: Masovian
- County: Mińsk
- Gmina: Dębe Wielkie

Walercin [vaˈlɛrt͡ɕin] is a village in the administrative district of Gmina Dębe Wielkie, within Mińsk County, Masovian Voivodeship, in east-central Poland.
