= Choszczówka Stojecka =

- Village
- Location within Poland
- Coordinates: 52°11′52″N 21°30′26″E
- Country: Poland
- Voivodeship: Masovian
- County: Mińsk
- Gmina: Dębe Wielkie
- Population: 302

Choszczówka Stojecka [xɔʂˈt͡ʂufka stɔˈjɛt͡ska] is a village in the administrative district of Gmina Dębe Wielkie, within Mińsk County, Masovian Voivodeship, in east-central Poland.
