= Gmina Dębe Wielkie =

Gmina Dębe Wielkie Dębe Wielkie Commune
- Gmina
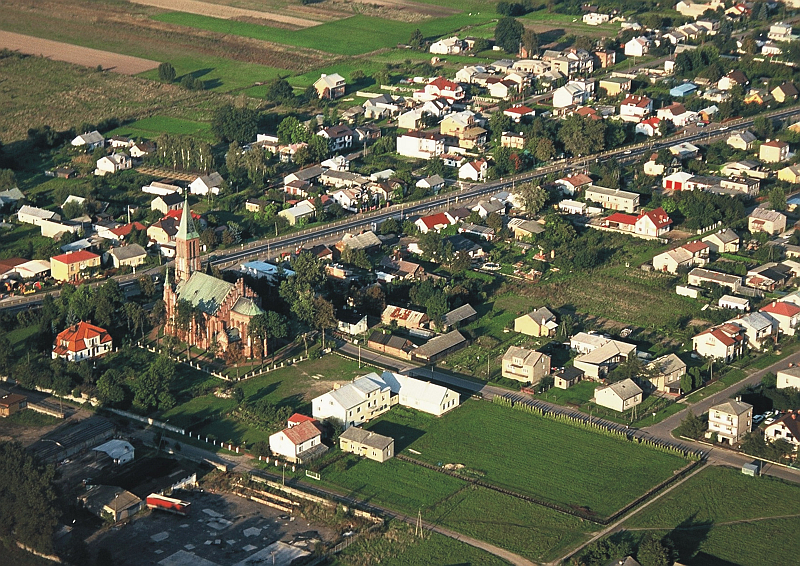

- Coat of arms

- Location within Poland
- Coordinates (Dębe Wielkie): 52°11′59″N 21°27′1″E
- Country: Poland
- Voivodeship: Masovian
- County: Mińsk
- Seat: Dębe Wielkie

Area
  - Total: 77.88 km^{2} (30.07 sq mi)

Population (31 December 2020)
  - Total: 10,684
  - Density: 137.2/km^{2} (355.3/sq mi)
- Website: www.debewielkie.pl

Gmina Dębe Wielkie is a rural gmina (administrative district) in Mińsk County, Masovian Voivodeship, in east-central Poland. Its seat is the village of Dębe Wielkie, which lies approximately 9 kilometres (6 mi) west of Mińsk Mazowiecki and 31 km (19 mi) east of Warsaw.

The gmina covers an area of 77.88 square kilometres (30.1 sq mi), and as of December 2020 it has a population of 10,684.

== Villages ==
Gmina Dębe Wielkie contains the villages and settlements of:

- Aleksandrówka
- Bykowizna
- Celinów
- Cezarów
- Choszczak
- Choszczówka Dębska
- Choszczówka Rudzka
- Choszczówka Stojecka
- Chrośla
- Cięciwa
- Cyganka
- Dębe Wielkie
- Górki
- Gorzanka
- Jędrzejnik
- Kąty Goździejewskie Drugie
- Kąty Goździejewskie Pierwsze
- Kobierne
- Łaszczyzna
- Olesin
- Ostrów-Kania
- Poręby
- Ruda
- Rysie
- Teresław
- Walercin

== Neighbouring gminas ==
Gmina Dębe Wielkie is bordered by the town of Zielonka and by the gminas of Halinów, Mińsk Mazowiecki, Stanisławów and Wiązowna.
