= Górki, Mińsk County =

Górki
- Village
- Location within Poland
- Coordinates: 52°10′38″N 21°26′00″E
- Country: Poland
- Voivodeship: Masovian
- County: Mińsk
- Gmina: Dębe Wielkie
- Population: 463

Górki [ˈɡurki] is a village in the administrative district of Gmina Dębe Wielkie, within Mińsk County, Masovian Voivodeship, in east-central Poland.
