= Teresław =

- Village
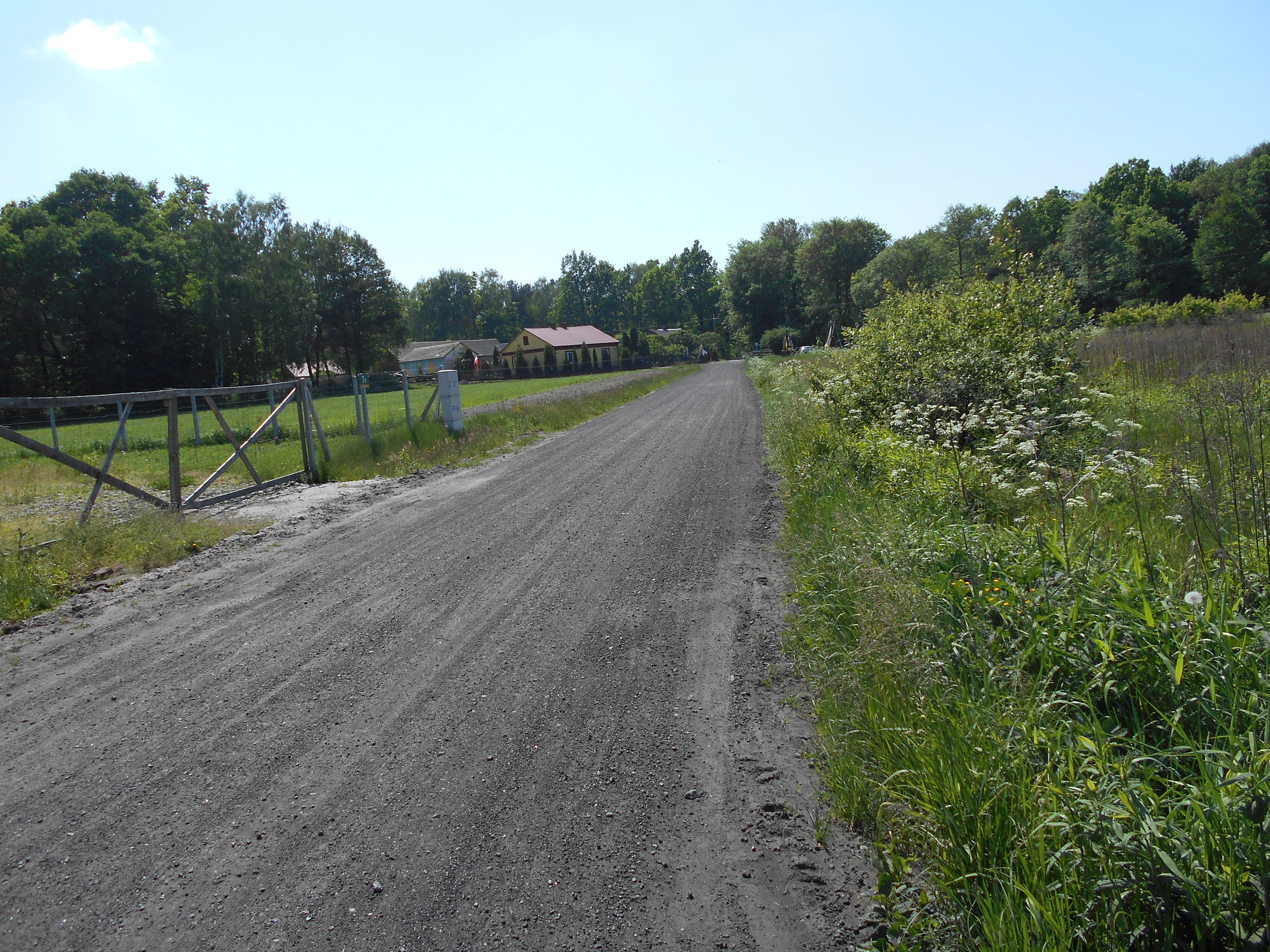
- Road leading to Teresław

- Coat of arms

- Location within Poland
- Coordinates: 52°09′56″N 21°26′20″E
- Country: Poland
- Voivodeship: Masovian
- County: Mińsk
- Gmina: Dębe Wielkie

Teresław [tɛˈrɛswaf] is a village in the administrative district of Gmina Dębe Wielkie, within Mińsk County, Masovian Voivodeship, in east-central Poland.
