= Choszczówka Dębska =

- Village
- Location within Poland
- Coordinates: 52°13′N 21°30′E
- Country: Poland
- Voivodeship: Masovian
- County: Mińsk
- Gmina: Dębe Wielkie
- Population: 105

Choszczówka Dębska [xɔʂˈt͡ʂufka ˈdɛmpska] is a village in the administrative district of Gmina Dębe Wielkie, within Mińsk County, Masovian Voivodeship, in east-central Poland.
