= Kąty Goździejewskie Drugie =

Village in Gmina Dębe Wielkie, Poland

- Village
- Location within Poland
- Coordinates: 52°15′30″N 21°24′30″E
- Country: Poland
- Voivodeship: Masovian
- County: Mińsk
- Gmina: Dębe Wielkie

Kąty Goździejewskie Drugie [ˈkɔntɨ ɡɔʑd͡ʑɛˈjɛfskʲɛ ˈdruɡʲɛ] is a village in the administrative district of Gmina Dębe Wielkie, within Mińsk County, Masovian Voivodeship, in east-central Poland.
