= Gorzanka =

- Village
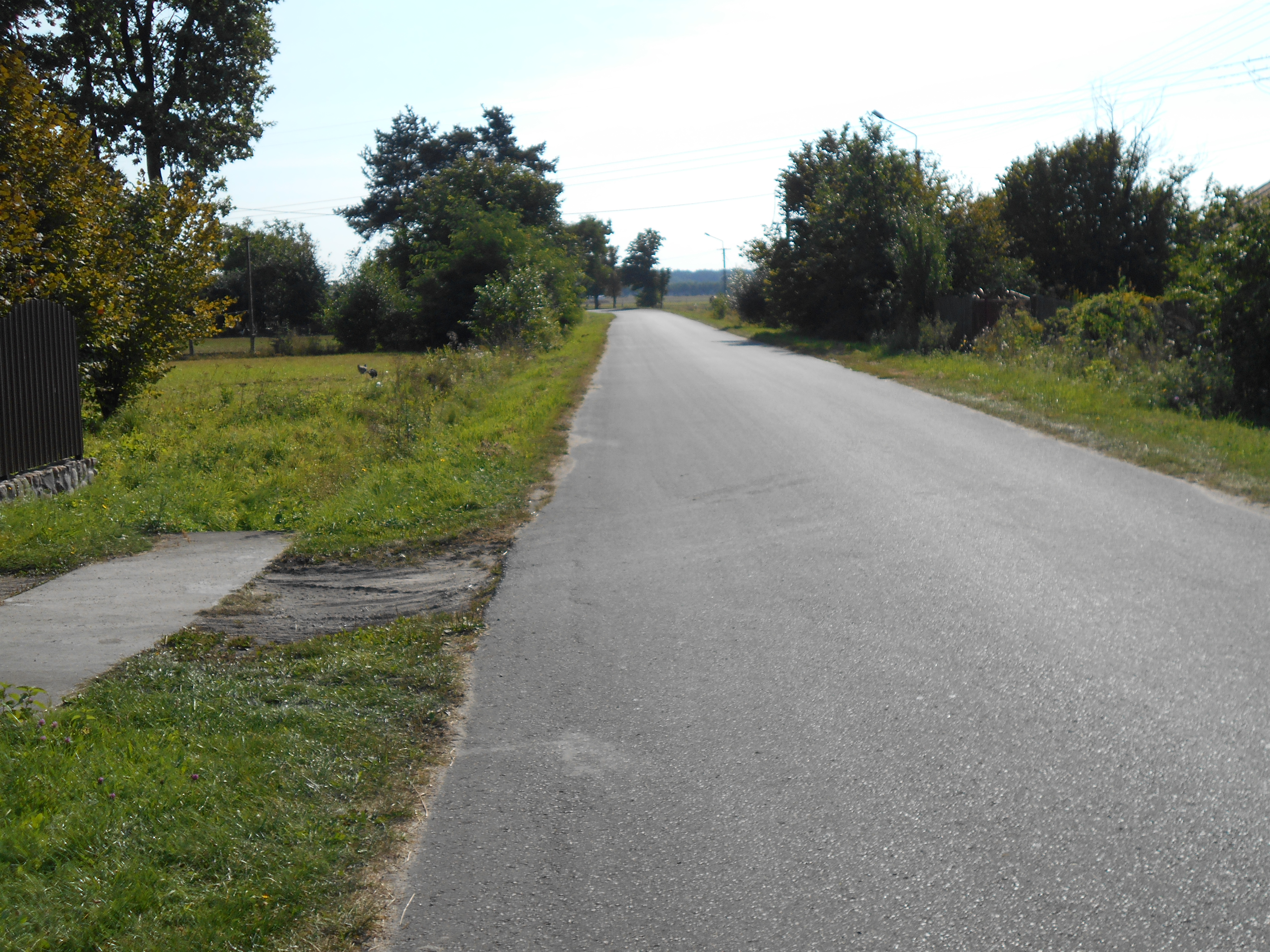
- Road in Gorzanka

- Location within Poland
- Coordinates: 52°14′32″N 21°29′02″E
- Country: Poland
- Voivodeship: Masovian
- County: Mińsk
- Gmina: Dębe Wielkie

Gorzanka [ɡɔˈʐanka] is a village in the administrative district of Gmina Dębe Wielkie, within Mińsk County, Masovian Voivodeship, in east-central Poland.
