= Kobierne =

- Village
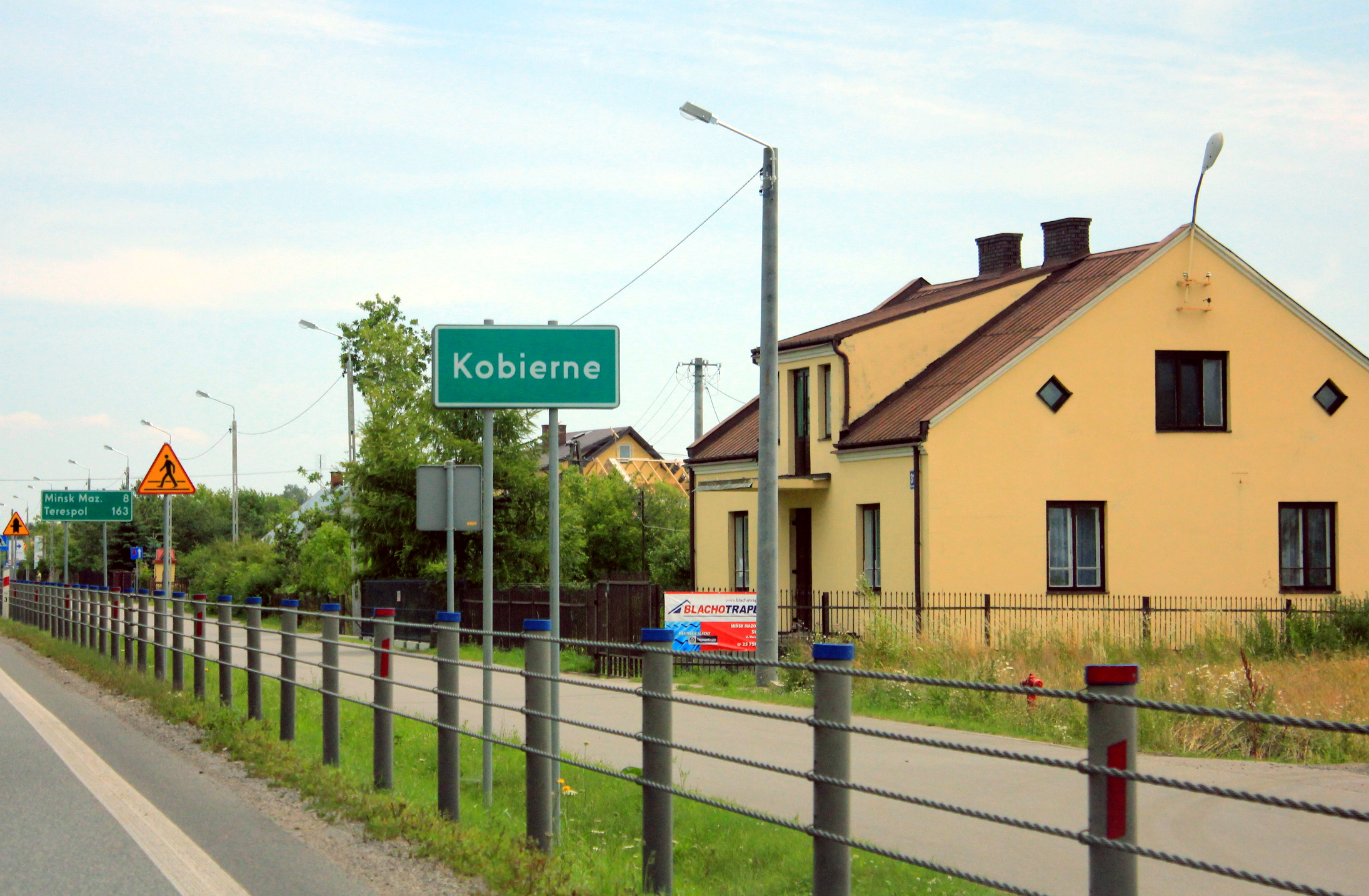

- Location within Poland
- Coordinates: 52°12′13″N 21°28′14″E
- Country: Poland
- Voivodeship: Masovian
- County: Mińsk
- Gmina: Dębe Wielkie

Kobierne [kɔˈbjɛrnɛ] is a village in the administrative district of Gmina Dębe Wielkie, within Mińsk County, Masovian Voivodeship, in east-central Poland.
