= Bykowizna =

- Village
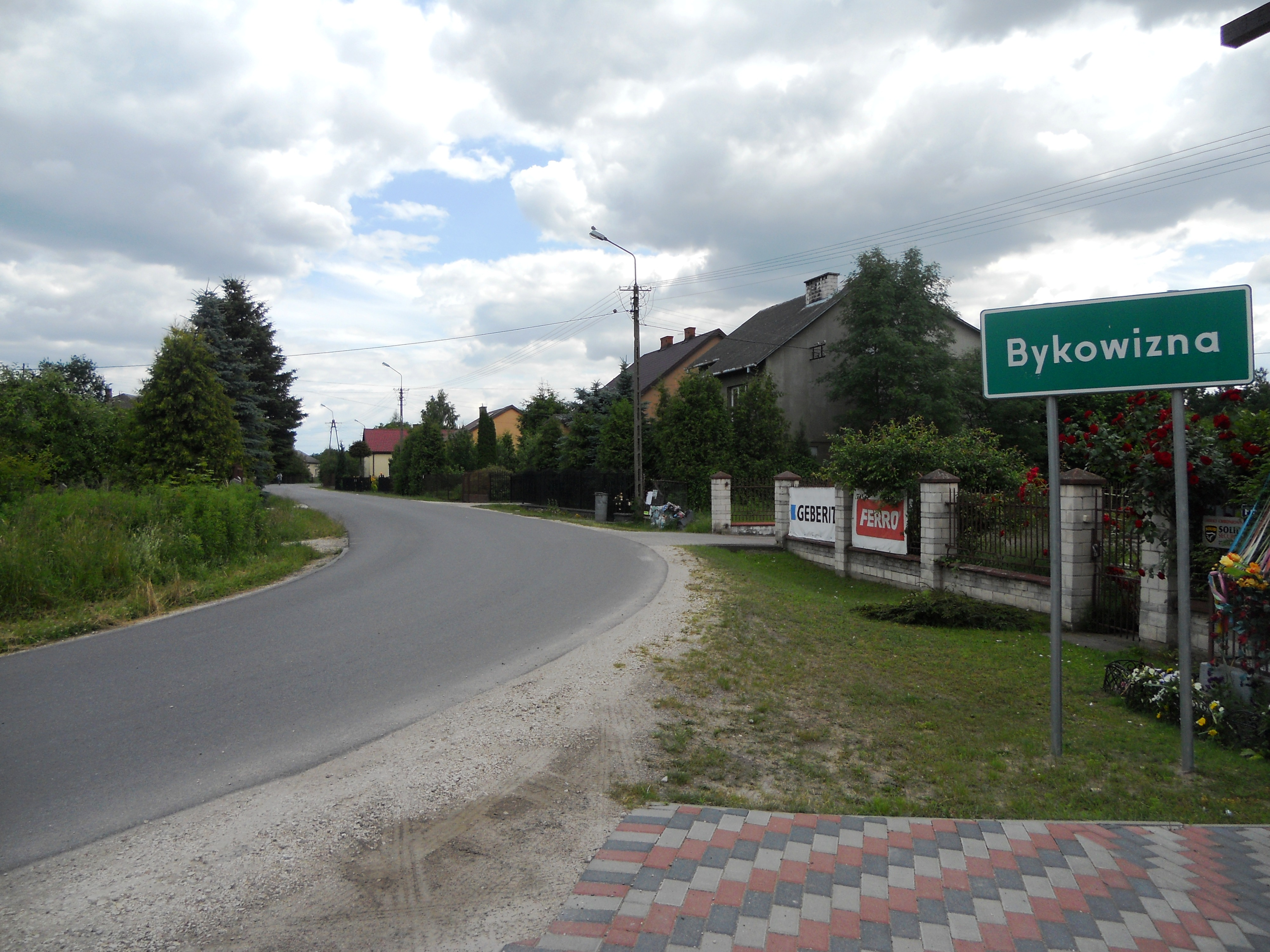
- Road to Bykowizna

- Location within Poland
- Coordinates: 52°10′30″N 21°28′54″E
- Country: Poland
- Voivodeship: Masovian
- County: Mińsk
- Gmina: Dębe Wielkie
- Population: 187

Bykowizna [bɨkɔˈvizna] is a village in the administrative district of Gmina Dębe Wielkie, within Mińsk County, Masovian Voivodeship, in east-central Poland.
