= Kąty Goździejewskie Pierwsze =

- Village
- Location within Poland
- Coordinates: 52°15′19″N 21°27′15″E
- Country: Poland
- Voivodeship: Masovian
- County: Mińsk
- Gmina: Dębe Wielkie
- Population: 230

Kąty Goździejewskie Pierwsze [ˈkɔntɨ ɡɔʑd͡ʑɛˈjɛfskʲɛ ˈpjɛrfʂɛ] is a village in the administrative district of Gmina Dębe Wielkie, within Mińsk County, Masovian Voivodeship, in east-central Poland.
