= Jerzy Kirchmayer =

Polish historian and general (1895–1959)

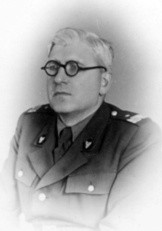
- Born: 29 August 1895; Kraków, Galicia, Austria-Hungary
- Died: 11 April 1959 (aged 63) Otwock, Poland
- Allegiance: Poland
- Service years: from 1917
- Rank: Brigadier-General
- Commands: CO of Military Historical Bureau

Jerzy Maria Kirchmayer (29 August 1895 – 11 April 1959) was a Polish historian and military commander, a brigadier general of the Polish Army and one of the first historians of the Warsaw Uprising of 1944.

== Biography ==
Son of Kazimierz, a lawyer, and Wanda Matłaczyńska. He finished primary school in Lviv, and in 1914 graduated from the Jesuit Fathers' Scientific and Educational Institute in Chyrów, where he received his high school diploma.

In 1914, he was arrested in the Kingdom of Poland by the Russian authorities and deported deep into Russia. In 1918, he joined the light brigade of the III Polish Corps, which was being organized in Ukraine. After returning to Poland, he volunteered for the Polish Army. On December 29, 1918, he began serving in the 7th Field Artillery Regiment and took part in the Polish-Soviet War.

After the war, he remained in the army. He graduated from the School of Artillery Cadets in Poznań in 1921, and from the Artillery Training Centre in Toruń in 1924. In the years 1921–1930 he served in lower command positions in the 3rd Heavy Artillery Regiment and the 16th Field Artillery Regiment, with a two-year break (1924–1926), when he served in the Artillery Office of the French Military Mission.

From 15 October to 15 December 1930 he took a Trial Course at the Higher Military School for Officers and then was called up as candidate for the normal course 1930–1932. From 5 January 1931 he was a student of the 11th Normal Course of the Higher Military School in Warsaw. On November 1, 1932, after completing the course and receiving the academic diploma of a certified officer, he was assigned to the 13th Infantry Division in Równe, and then to the Army Inspectorate in Toruń as the 2nd staff officer.

During the Invasion of Poland, he was deputy head of the 3rd Department of the "Pomorze" Army Staff, and was seriously wounded in the Kampinos Forest. During the German occupation, in the ranks of the Union of Armed Struggle (later renamed the Home Army), he was the chief of staff of the Warsaw Voivodeship District and an officer of the 3rd Department of the Main Command. He lost a leg in the conspiracy.

In July 1944, he volunteered for the Polish People's Army. Initially, he organized the historical service. He was the head of the Military Historical Office at the Military Scientific and Publishing Institute. He then became the head of the Historical Department of the General Staff of the Polish Army. Then he was an officer for special orders of the Chief of General Staff (1947). After completing a special mission, he was sent to the General Staff Academy, where he was the director of science and then a lecturer.

In 1948 he was removed from the army. From February 1949 he was a scientific editor at the publishing house "Prasa Wojskowa". On May 13, 1950 he was arrested by officers of the Ministry of Public Security on false charges, a year later he was sentenced to life imprisonment. In 1951 all of his works were withdrawn from Polish libraries and subjected to censorship. On October 15, 1955 he was released and in April 1956 he was rehabilitated. He then worked at the Institute of History of the Polish Academy of Sciences as a deputy professor, initially in the Department of the History of Military Art, and then in the Department of the History of Poland in World War II.

He was the author of many publications in the field of military history and artillery techniques and tactics.

He was an active member of the Union of Participants in Armed Struggle, where he was vice-president of the Main Board, and then joined the Society of Fighters for Freedom and Democracy as a member of the Supreme Council and Main Board, and chairman of the Decorations Commission.

He lived in Warsaw at ul. Filtrowa 63. From 1930 he was married to Wanda née Mikulski (1908–1995). The couple had a daughter and a son. He died on April 11, 1959, while convalescing in the Military Sanatorium in Otwock. He was buried in the Powązki Military Cemetery in Warsaw. A commemorative plaque on the building at 63 Filtrowa Street, where he lived, was unveiled in 2008.

== Promotions ==
- Chorąży (Standard-bearer) - 1920
- Podporucznik (Second lieutenant) - June 1922
- Porucznik (First lieutenant) - January 1924
- Kapitan (Captain) - 27 January 1927
- Major (Major) - 1 January 1936
- Podpułkownik (Lieutenant colonel) - 11 November 1942
- Pułkownik (Colonel) - 1945
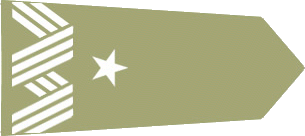
- Generał brygady (Brigadier general) - 22 July 1947

== Awards and decorations ==
- Order of the Cross of Grunwald, 3rd Class (1945)
- Cross of Valour (1920)
- Silver Cross of Merit (1928)
- Partisan Cross (1946)

== Works ==
1. Jerzy Kirchmayer (1946). Geneza Powstania Warszawskiego. Łódź: Czytelnik. p. 30.
2. Jerzy Kirchmayer (1946). Kampania Wrześniowa. Warsaw: Czytelnik. p. 270.
3. Jerzy Kirchmayer (1958). Na marginesie londyńskiego wydania "Polskie Siły Zbrojne w II wojnie świetowej". Uwagi i polemiki. Warsaw: Ministerstwo Obrony Narodowej (MON). p. 165.
4. Jerzy Kirchmayer (1959). 1939 i 1944. Kilka zagadnień polskich. Warsaw: Książka i Wiedza. p. 207.
5. Jerzy Kirchmayer (1965). Pamiętniki. Warsaw: Książka i Wiedza. p. 607.
6. Jerzy Kirchmayer (1971). W kraju i na obczyźnie. Warsaw: Książka i Wiedza. p. 381.
7. Jerzy Kirchmayer (1978). Powstanie warszawskie. Warsaw: Książka i Wiedza. p. 576. ISBN 83-05-11080-X.
