= Wojciech Bartelski =

Polish politician

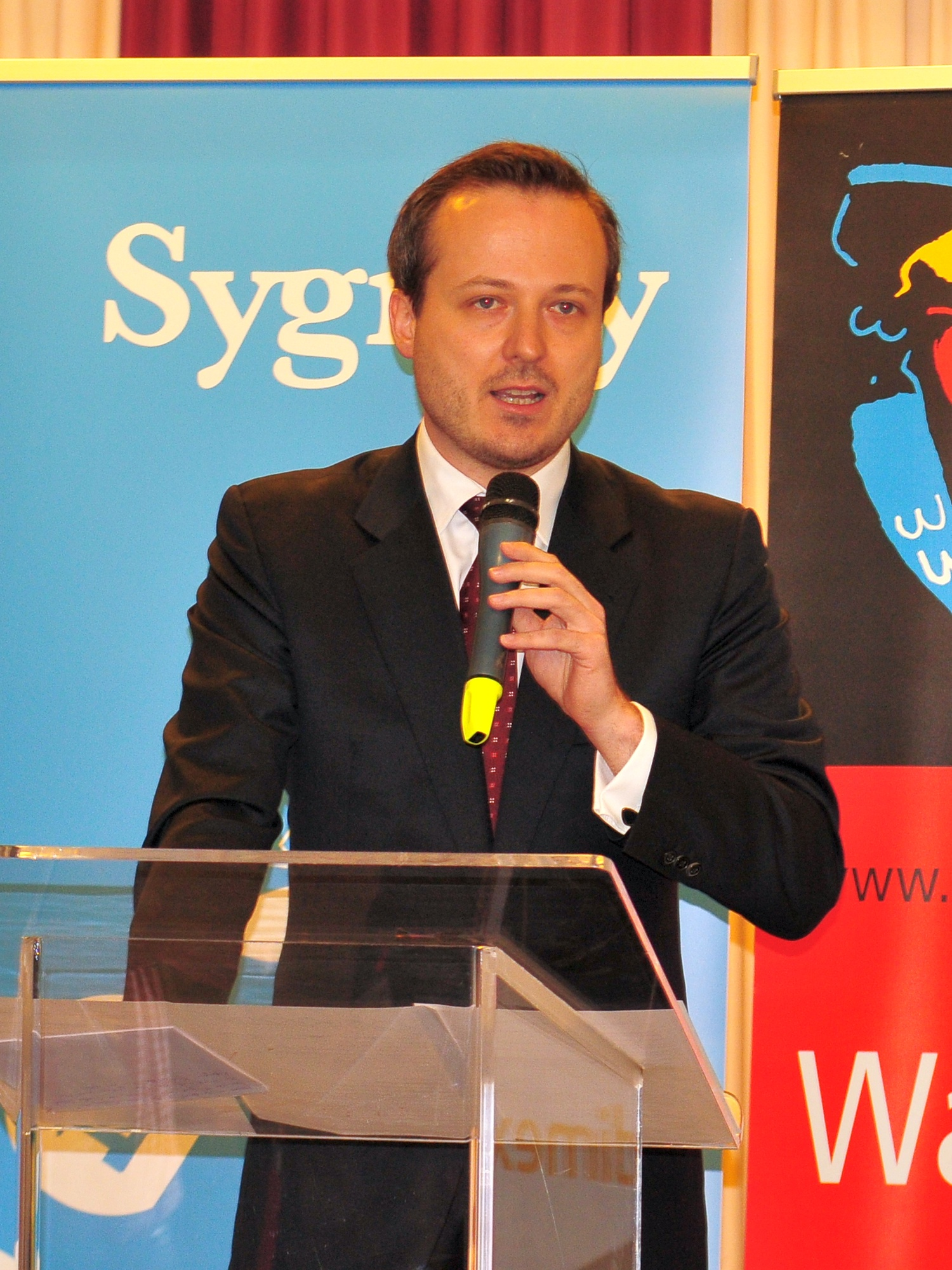
Wojciech Bartelski, Warsaw 2013

Wojciech Bartelski (born 20 June 1977 in Warsaw) is a Polish politician and creator of the website OlimpBase.

He graduated in 2002 in economics from Warsaw University. He is a politician by profession, a right-wing member of Platforma Obywatelska. In 2006 he was elected to the Warsaw City Council, but later gave up that seat to become the mayor of the Warsaw borough of Śródmieście.

In the early 1990s he played chess as a member of the Warsaw Chess Club, but gave up competitive chess after founding OlimpBase, the world's biggest database of team chess events.
