= Błyskawica radiostation =

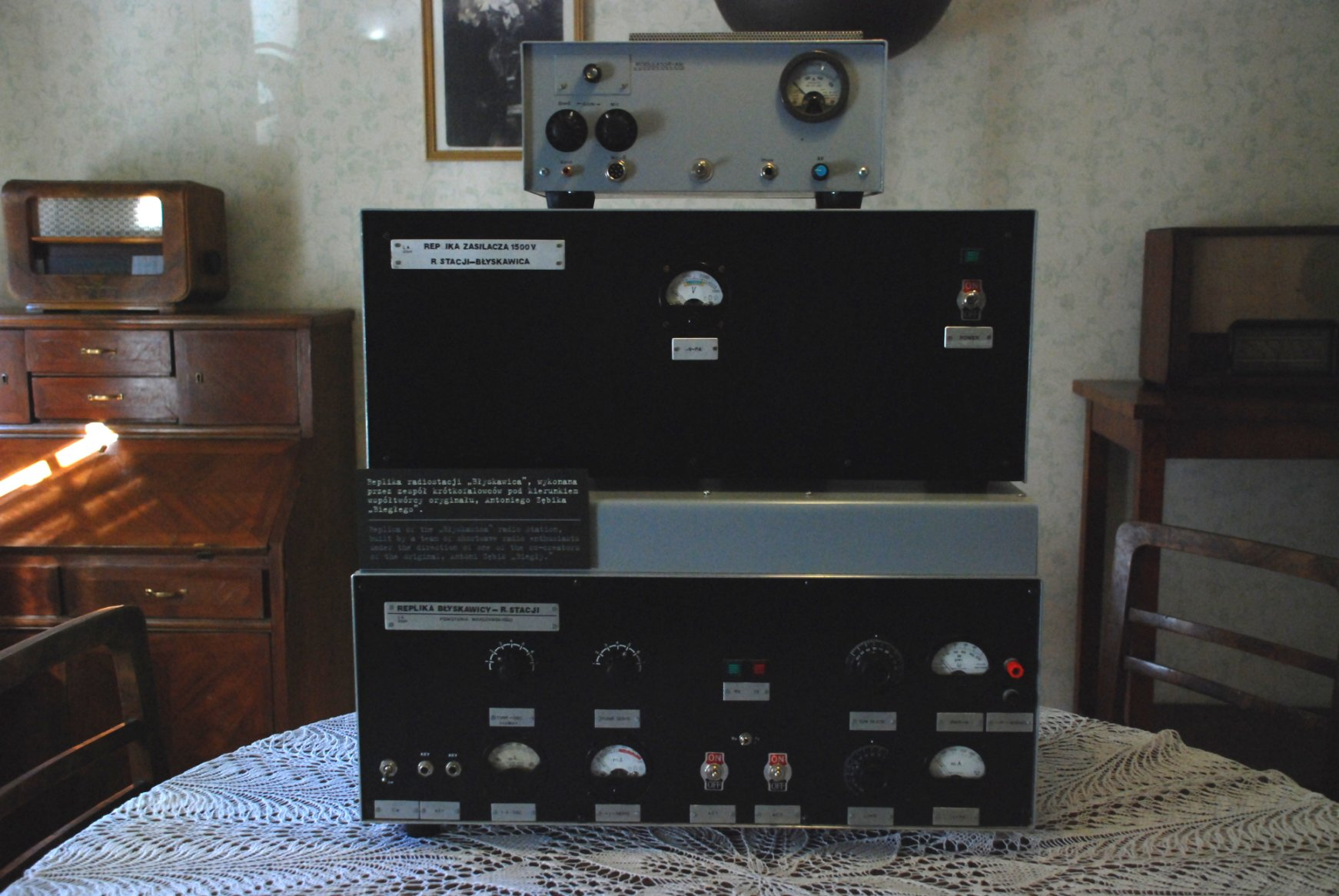
A replica of the Błyskawica radio station made by a team of radio amateurs under the direction of a co-constructor of its original, Antoni Zębik pseudonym "Biegły", in the Museum of the Warsaw Uprising

The Błyskawica radio station ("Lightning") was an insurgent radio transmitter broadcasting at 200 Watts from Warsaw during the Warsaw Uprising of 1944, from 8 August until the end of the struggle. The transmitter was constructed by Antoni Zębik, pseudonym "Biegły". Its signal was the melody of Warszawianka.

Initially, the radio station was placed in the building of PKO (Pocztowa Kasa Oszczędności, Engl.: Postal Savings Bank) at 9 Jasna Street. On 25 August, it was moved to the Café Adria at 10 Moniuszki Street. On 4 September, it was relocated to the building of the former USSR embassy at 15 Poznańska Street and then to the Public Library at 26 Koszykowa Street.

The chief of the team was Stanisław Zadrożny, pseudonym "Pawlicz". His deputy was Zofia Rutkowska, pseudonym "Ewa", who assumed the care of the performance of the program. Jan Nowak-Jeziorański, together with RAF airman John Ward, conducted English-language broadcasts. Zbigniew Świętochowski, pseudonym "Krzysztof", Stefan Sojecki, Zbigniew Jasiński and Mieczysław Ubysz worked as speakers. News and reports were carried by Jacek Wołowski.

The first words broadcast by this radio station, spoken by Zbigniew Świętochowski, were:

Hello, here is Błyskawica speaking! A radio transmitter of the Home Army in Warsaw, on 32.8 and 52.1 meter bands.
The spirit of Warsaw is wonderful.The women of Warsaw are wonderful.
They are everywhere, in the front line together with soldiers as nurses or liaison officers.
Even children are animated by a wonderful spirit of bravery. We greet all freedom-loving people of the world!
Polish soldiers who fight in Italy, Polish pilots and mariners.

The radio broadcast also on the medium wave a subversive program addressed to Wehrmacht soldiers as part of the "N" Action.

On 4 October, when the uprising was drawing near the end, it broadcast its final message, lasting 10 minutes. After this transmission, the radio station was destroyed by the then chief of the team Jan Georgica, pseudonym "Grzegorzewicz".

A replica of "Błyskawica" radio station is in the Museum of the Warsaw Uprising. In "Jednodniówka" – a paper published on 1 August 2004 by this museum, it was written that:

The replica of "Błyskawica" basically does not differ from the original. The creators took care of every detail, even using original knobs. The only difference is that the contemporary "Błyskawica" transmits on a different waveband: 7.043 MHz, because the waveband of the time of the Warsaw Uprising is now used by (sic!) NATO.

During the Warsaw Uprising, it also used another transmitter, called "Burza" ("Tempest"), constructed by Włodzimierz Markowski. It broadcast from 3 August in the building of the Main Post Office on Napoleon Square (now Warsaw Insurgents Square).
