= Lesław Bartelski =

Polish writer

Lesław Marian Bartelski
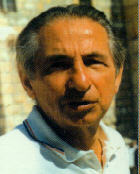
- Born: 8 September 1920; Warsaw, Poland
- Died: 27 March 2006 (aged 85); Warsaw, Poland
- Occupation: writer

Lesław Marian Bartelski (September 8, 1920 – March 27, 2006) was a Polish writer, perhaps best known for his work, Warsaw Ghetto Thermopolye and his novel The Blood-stained Wings.

== Early life ==
Bartelski was born in Warsaw, where he spent most of his life. During World War II, he was member of the Polish resistance (1941–1945), fighting against Nazi occupation. During the war, he wrote for the underground magazine Sztuka i Naród (Art and Nation), beginning his literary career. In 1944, as a member of the Home Army he fought in the Warsaw Uprising.

== Literary career ==
After the war, Bartelski studied law at Warsaw University, and began a writing career. He was active in a large number of organizations, including Polish Writer's Association (where he served as the chair of its Warsaw branch from 1972 to 1978). Over his career, he won numerous awards for his work, including the Prize of Minister of Defense (2nd class) in 1969, Pietrzak Prize in 1969 and 1985, Warsaw Prize in 1969, Prize of Minister Culture and Art (1st class) in 1977, Prize of president of Warsaw in 1990 and Reymont Prize in 1988

== Publications ==
  - 1951 – Ludzie zza rzeki (People Behind the River)
  - 1958 – Pejzaż dwukrotny (Double Landscape)
  - 1962 – Złota mahmudija (Golden Mahmudiha)
  - 1964 – Wodorosty (Seaweeds)
  - 1968 – Dialog z cieniem (Dialogue with a Shadow)
  - 1973 – Niedziela bez dzwonów (Sunday without Bells)
  - 1975 – Krwawe skrzydła (The Blood-stained Wings)
  - 1978 – Rajski ogród (The Garden of Eden)
