= Rudnik =

Rudnik may refer to:

== Places ==
=== Bosnia and Herzegovina ===
- Rudnik (Ilidža), a village

=== Bulgaria ===
- Rudnik, Burgas Province, a village
- Rudnik, Varna Province, a village

=== Czech Republic ===
- Rudník (Trutnov District), a municipality and village in the Hradec Králové Region

=== North Macedonia ===
- Rudnik, Veles, a village in Veles Municipality

=== Poland ===
- Rudnik, Greater Poland Voivodeship (west Poland)
- Rudnik, Gmina Dobczyce, in Lesser Poland Voivodeship (south Poland)
- Rudnik, Gmina Sułkowice, in Lesser Poland Voivodeship (south Poland)
- Rudnik, Łódź Voivodeship (central Poland)
- Rudnik, Gmina Rudnik, in Lublin Voivodeship (east Poland)
  - Gmina Rudnik, Lublin Voivodeship
- Rudnik, Lublin County, in Lublin Voivodeship (east Poland)
- Rudnik, Łosice County, in Masovian Voivodeship (central Poland)
- Rudnik, Mińsk County, in Masovian Voivodeship (central Poland)
- Rudnik, Otwock County, in Masovian Voivodeship (central Poland)
- Rudnik, Cieszyn County, in Silesian Voivodeship (south Poland)
- Rudnik, Racibórz County, in Silesian Voivodeship (south Poland)
  - Gmina Rudnik, Silesian Voivodeship
- Rudnik, Starachowice County, in Świętokrzyskie Voivodeship (south-central Poland)
- Rudnik, Włoszczowa County, in Świętokrzyskie Voivodeship (south-central Poland)
- Rudnik, Kraśnik County, in Lublin Voivodeship (south-east Poland)
- Rudnik, Szczecin, a part of Szczecin, Poland
- Rudnik, now part of Kąkolewnica, in Radzyń County, Lublin Voivodeship
- Rudnik nad Sanem, a town in Subcarpathian Voivodeship, Poland
- Rudnik Szlachecki, a village in Lublin Voivodeship, Poland

=== Serbia ===
- Rudnik (mountain), a mountain
- Rudnik (Gornji Milanovac), a small town in the municipality of Gornji Milanovac
- Aleksinački Rudnik, a town
- Senjski Rudnik, a village

=== Slovakia ===
- Rudník, Košice-okolie District, a municipality and village in the Košice Region
- Rudník, Myjava District, a municipality and village in the Trenčín Region

=== Slovenia ===
- Rudnik District, a district of Ljubljana
- Rudnik, Ljubljana, a former village, now part of Ljubljana
- Rudnik pri Moravčah, a village near Moravče
- Rudnik pri Radomljah, a village near Kamnik

== People ==
- Rudnik (surname)

== See also ==
- Rudnick (disambiguation)
