= Podskwarne =

- Village
- Location within Poland
- Coordinates: 52°6′35″N 21°47′22″E
- Country: Poland
- Voivodeship: Masovian
- County: Mińsk
- Gmina: Cegłów
- Population: 164

Podskwarne [pɔtskˈfarnɛ] is a village in the administrative district of Gmina Cegłów, within Mińsk County, Masovian Voivodeship, in east-central Poland.

== History ==
The settlement on the road Kuflew - Cegłów has been created in the half of 19th century, after displacing rural population from a center of Kuflew including there, although during a long time there wasn't a name "Podskwarne", probably it was then a part of Kuflew. A new name was probably introduced at the end of 1910's or the beginning of 1920's, this name is related with neighbouring village - Skwarne. During the interbellum it was in use also the name "Kuflew-Podskwarne".
