= Rososz =

Rososz may refer to the following places:

- Rososz, Łódź Voivodeship (central Poland)
- Rososz, Lublin Voivodeship (east Poland)
- Rososz, Grójec County in Masovian Voivodeship (east-central Poland)
- Rososz, Mińsk County in Masovian Voivodeship (east-central Poland)
- Rososz, Ostrołęka County in Masovian Voivodeship (east-central Poland)
- Rososz, Gmina Wąsewo, Ostrów County in Masovian Voivodeship (east-central Poland)
- Rososz, Siedlce County in Masovian Voivodeship (east-central Poland)
