= Kołacz (disambiguation) =

Kołacz is a type of pastry of Polish origin.

Kołacz may also refer to:

== People ==
- Agnieszka Kołacz-Leszczyńska (born 1972), Polish politician
- Grzegorz Kołacz (born 1966), Polish politician

== Places ==
- Kołacz, Masovian Voivodeship (east-central Poland)
- Kołacz, West Pomeranian Voivodeship (north-west Poland)
