= Wiktorów =

Wiktorów may refer to the following places:

- Wiktorów, Wieluń County in Łódź Voivodeship (central Poland)
- Wiktorów, Zduńska Wola County in Łódź Voivodeship (central Poland)
- Wiktorów, Zgierz County in Łódź Voivodeship (central Poland)
- Wiktorów, Warsaw West County in Masovian Voivodeship (east-central Poland)
- Wiktorów, Wołomin County in Masovian Voivodeship (east-central Poland)
