= Lubomin =

Lubomin may refer to the following places:

- Lubomin, Kuyavian-Pomeranian Voivodeship (central Poland)
- Lubomin, Lower Silesian Voivodeship (south-west Poland)
- Lubomin, Gmina Mrozy in Masovian Voivodeship (east-central Poland)
- Lubomin, Gmina Stanisławów in Masovian Voivodeship (east-central Poland)
- Lubomin, Gmina Nasielsk, Nowy Dwór County in Masovian Voivodeship (east-central Poland)
