= Klapka =

Klapka (feminine Klapková) is a Czech surname. Notable people include:

- Adam Klapka, Czech ice hockey player
- Dalimil Klapka, Czech actor
- György Klapka (1820–1892), Hungarian soldier
- Filip Klapka (born 1981), Czech footballer
- Kateřina Klapková, Czech tennis player
- Rudolf Klapka, Czech footballer
- Jerome Klapka Jerome (1859–1927), English humourist and writer

== See also ==
- Klapka, Poland, village in Poland
