= Gmina Biała =

Gmina Biała may refer to either of the following administrative districts in Poland:

- Gmina Biała, Opole Voivodeship, an urban-rural gmina in south-western Poland
- Gmina Biała, Łódź Voivodeship, a rural gmina in central Poland
