= Guzew =

Guzew may refer to the following places:

- Guzew, Łódź Voivodeship (central Poland)
- Guzew, Mińsk County in Masovian Voivodeship (east-central Poland)
- Guzew, Płock County in Masovian Voivodeship (east-central Poland)
