= Biała Pierwsza =

Biała Pierwsza refers to the following places in Poland:

- Biała Pierwsza, Łódź Voivodeship
- Biała Pierwsza, Lublin Voivodeship
