= Rudnick =

Rudnick is a surname. Notable people with the surname include:

- Bryan G. Rudnick, American political public relations consultant
- Dorothea Rudnick (1907–1990), American biologist and scientific editor
- Elynor Rudnick (1923–1996), American aviator
- Irene Krugman Rudnick (1929–2019), American lawyer and politician
- Josef Rudnick (1917–2009), German businessman and politician
- Joseph Rudnick (born 1944), American physicist
- Joel Rudnick (born 1936), American painter and sculptor
- Paul Rudnick (born 1957), American writer
- Roberta Rudnick (born 1958), American earth scientist
- Steve Rudnick, American screenwriter
- Zeev Rudnick (born 1961), Israeli mathematician

== See also ==
- Rudnik (disambiguation)
