= Topor =

Topor may refer to:

== Places ==
- Topor (Barclayville), a village in Barclayville township, Grand Kru County, Liberia
- Topór, a nature reserve in Łuków Forest, Poland
- Topór, Mińsk County, a village in Gmina Mrozy, Mińsk County, Masovian Voivodeship, Poland
- Topór, Węgrów County, a village in Gmina Stoczek, Węgrów County, Masovian Voivodeship, Poland

== Other ==
- Topor (headgear), Bengali Hindu wedding headwear
- Topor (surname), including a list of people with that name
- Topór coat of arms, a Polish coat of arms
- TopoR, an automated topological router for printed circuit boards
