= Lipiny, Mińsk County =

Lipiny
- Village
- Location within Poland
- Coordinates: 52°4′9″N 21°54′12″E
- Country: Poland
- Voivodeship: Masovian
- County: Mińsk
- Gmina: Mrozy
- Population: 262

Lipiny [liˈpinɨ] is a village in the administrative district of Gmina Mrozy, within Mińsk County, Masovian Voivodeship, in east-central Poland.
