= Topor (surname) =

The surname Topor may refer to:

- Juraj Topor, a musician in Slovak rock band Tublatanka
- Krzysztof Topór (born 1972), Polish Olympic biathlete
- Marcela Topor (born 1976), Romanian journalist and First Lady of Catalonia
- Nikolai Topor-Stanley (born 1985), Australian football (soccer) player
- Roland Topor (1938–1997), French surrealist artist, writer, and filmmaker
- Ted Topor (1930–2017), American football player
- Tom Topor (born 1938), American playwright, screenwriter, and novelist

== See also ==
- Topor (disambiguation)
- Toporov (surname)
