= Choszcze =

- Village
- Location within Poland
- Coordinates: 52°9′N 21°53′E
- Country: Poland
- Voivodeship: Masovian
- County: Mińsk
- Gmina: Mrozy
- Population: 79

Choszcze [ˈxɔʂt͡ʂɛ] is a village in the administrative district of Gmina Mrozy, within Mińsk County, Masovian Voivodeship, in east-central Poland.
