= Natolin, Mińsk County =

Natolin
- Village
- Location within Poland
- Coordinates: 52°09′03″N 21°51′27″E
- Country: Poland
- Voivodeship: Masovian
- County: Mińsk
- Gmina: Mrozy
- Population: 35

Natolin [naˈtɔlin] is a village in the administrative district of Gmina Mrozy, within Mińsk County, Masovian Voivodeship, in east-central Poland.
