= Kiczki Drugie =

- Village
- Location within Poland
- Coordinates: 52°4′35″N 21°44′39″E
- Country: Poland
- Voivodeship: Masovian
- County: Mińsk
- Gmina: Cegłów
- Population: 259

Kiczki Drugie [ˈkit͡ʂki ˈdruɡʲɛ] is a village in the administrative district of Gmina Cegłów, within Mińsk County, Masovian Voivodeship, in east-central Poland.
