= Gmina Mrozy =

Gmina Mrozy Mrozy Commune
- Gmina
- Coat of arms
- Interactive map of Gmina Mrozy
- Coordinates (Mrozy): 52°9′58″N 21°48′8″E
- Country: Poland
- Voivodeship: Masovian
- County: Mińsk
- Seat: Mrozy

Area
  - Total: 145.24 km^{2} (56.08 sq mi)

Population (2023)
  - Total: 8,640
  - Density: 59.5/km^{2} (154/sq mi)
- Website: http://www.mrozy.pl

Gmina Mrozy is an urban-rural gmina (administrative district) in Mińsk County, Masovian Voivodeship, in east-central Poland. Its seat is the town of Mrozy, which lies approximately 17 kilometres (11 mi) east of Mińsk Mazowiecki and 56 km (35 mi) east of Warsaw.

The gmina covers an area of 145.24 square kilometres (56.1 sq mi), and as of 2023 its total population is 8,640.

== Villages ==
Gmina Mrozy contains the villages and settlements of Borki, Choszcze, Dąbrowa, Dębowce, Gójszcz, Grodzisk, Guzew, Jeruzal, Kołacz, Kruki, Kuflew, Lipiny, Lubomin, Łukówiec, Mała Wieś, Mrozy, Natolin, Płomieniec, Porzewnica, Rudka, Skruda, Sokolnik, Topór, Trojanów, Wola Paprotnia and Wola Rafałowska.

== Neighbouring gminas ==
Gmina Mrozy is bordered by the gminas of Cegłów, Kałuszyn, Kotuń, Latowicz and Wodynie.
