= Janowiec, Łódź Voivodeship =

Village in Gmina Biała, Poland

Janowiec
- Village
- Location within Poland
- Coordinates: 51°14′45″N 18°22′46″E
- Country: Poland
- Voivodeship: Łódź
- County: Wieluń
- Gmina: Biała

Janowiec [jaˈnɔvjɛt͡s] is a village in the administrative district of Gmina Biała, within Wieluń County, Łódź Voivodeship, in central Poland.
