= Dębowce =

- Village
- Location within Poland
- Coordinates: 52°4′N 21°55′E
- Country: Poland
- Voivodeship: Masovian
- County: Mińsk
- Gmina: Mrozy
- Population: 270

Dębowce [dɛmˈbɔft͡sɛ] is a village in the administrative district of Gmina Mrozy, within Mińsk County, Masovian Voivodeship, in east-central Poland.
