= Mienia, Masovian Voivodeship =

Mienia
- Village
- Location within Poland
- Coordinates: 52°9′13″N 21°42′5″E
- Country: Poland
- Voivodeship: Masovian
- County: Mińsk
- Gmina: Cegłów
- Population: 400

Mienia [ˈmjɛɲa] is a village in the administrative district of Gmina Cegłów, within Mińsk County, Masovian Voivodeship, in east-central Poland.
