= Gmina Cegłów =

Gmina Cegłów Cegłów Commune
- Gmina
- Coat of arms
- Interactive map of Gmina Cegłów
- Coordinates (Cegłów): 52°8′45″N 21°44′8″E
- Country: Poland
- Voivodeship: Masovian
- County: Mińsk
- Seat: Cegłów

Area
  - Total: 95.74 km^{2} (36.97 sq mi)

Population (2013)
  - Total: 6,180
  - Density: 64.5/km^{2} (167/sq mi)
- Website: http://www.ceglow.pl/

Gmina Cegłów is an urban-rural gmina (administrative district) in Mińsk County, Masovian Voivodeship, in east-central Poland. Its seat is the town of Cegłów, which lies approximately 13 kilometres (8 mi) east of Mińsk Mazowiecki and 51 km (32 mi) east of Warsaw.

The gmina covers an area of 95.74 square kilometres (37.0 sq mi), and as of 2006 its total population is 6,369 (6,180 in 2013).

== Villages ==
Gmina Cegłów contains the villages and settlements of Cegłów, Huta Kuflewska, Kiczki Drugie, Kiczki Pierwsze, Mienia, Pełczanka, Piaseczno, Podciernie, Podskwarne, Posiadały, Rososz, Rudnik, Skupie, Skwarne, Tyborów, Wiciejów, Wola Stanisławowska, Wólka Wiciejowska and Woźbin.

== Neighbouring gminas ==
Gmina Cegłów is bordered by the gminas of Jakubów, Kałuszyn, Latowicz, Mińsk Mazowiecki, Mrozy and Siennica.
