= Dąbrowa, Gmina Mrozy =

Dąbrowa
- Village
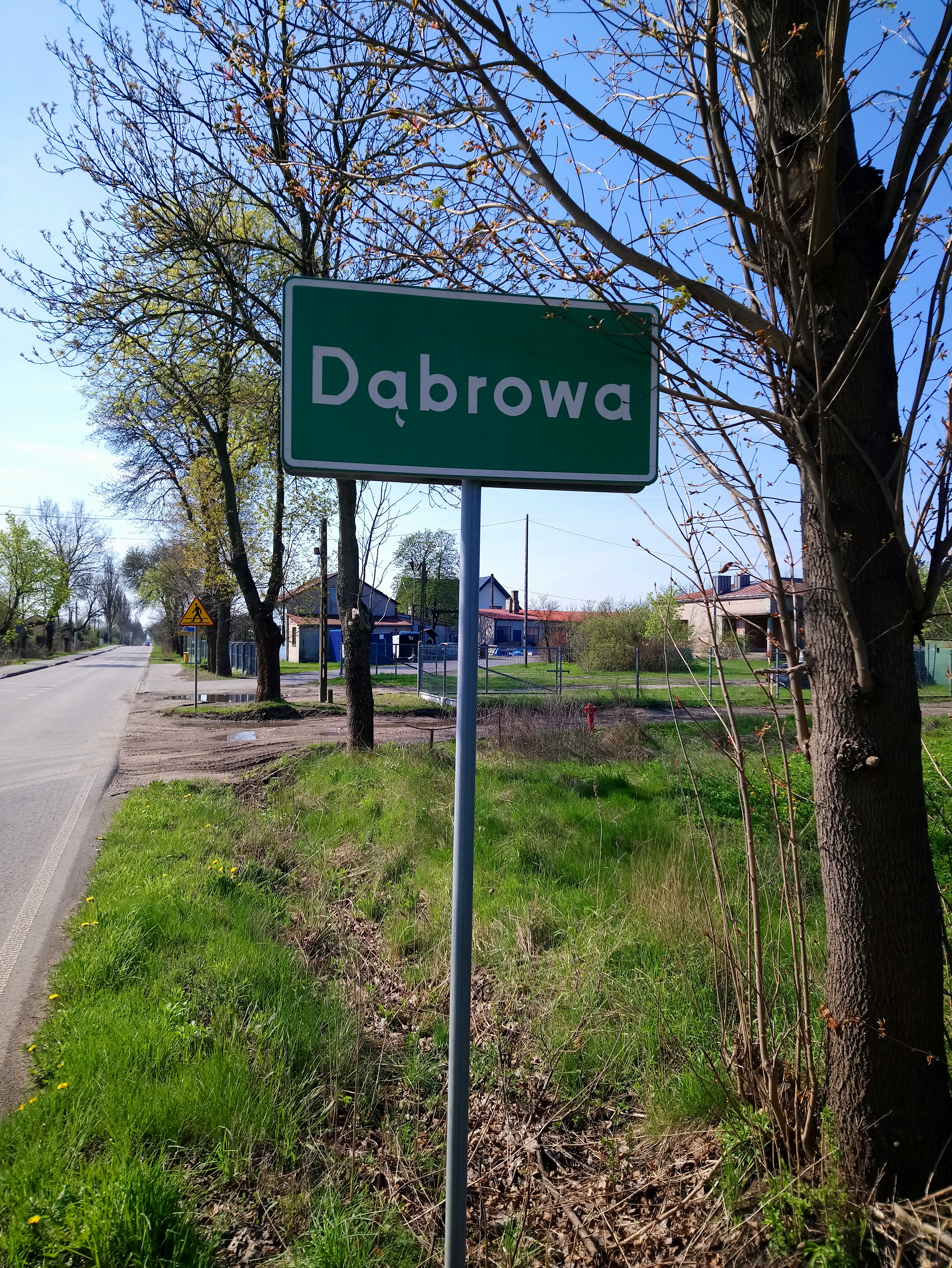

- Location within Poland
- Coordinates: 52°07′47″N 21°48′31″E
- Country: Poland
- Voivodeship: Masovian
- County: Mińsk
- Gmina: Mrozy

Dąbrowa [dɔmˈbrɔva] is a village in the administrative district of Gmina Mrozy, within Mińsk County, Masovian Voivodeship, in east-central Poland.
