= Wola Rafałowska, Masovian Voivodeship =

Wola Rafałowska
- Village
- Location within Poland
- Coordinates: 52°9′N 21°49′E
- Country: Poland
- Voivodeship: Masovian
- County: Mińsk
- Gmina: Mrozy
- Population: 416

Wola Rafałowska [ˈvɔla rafaˈwɔfska] is a village in the administrative district of Gmina Mrozy, within Mińsk County, Masovian Voivodeship, in east-central Poland.
