= Wiciejów =

- Village
- Location within Poland
- Coordinates: 52°9′N 21°40′E
- Country: Poland
- Voivodeship: Masovian
- County: Mińsk
- Gmina: Cegłów
- Population: 278

Wiciejów [viˈt͡ɕɛjuf] is a village in the administrative district of Gmina Cegłów, within Mińsk County, Masovian Voivodeship, in east-central Poland.
