= Sokolnik, Masovian Voivodeship =

Sokolnik
- Village
- Location within Poland
- Coordinates: 52°8′N 21°48′E
- Country: Poland
- Voivodeship: Masovian
- County: Mińsk
- Gmina: Mrozy
- Population: 392 (2,023)

Sokolnik [sɔˈkɔlnik] is a village in the administrative district of Gmina Mrozy, within Mińsk County, Masovian Voivodeship, in east-central Poland. This village has also an integral part of its - Liwiec.

In past, it was a noble village in Garwolin County of Czersk Land in Mazovian Voivodship.

Catholic inhabitants of this village belong to Saint Martin and Nicholas Parish in Kuflew. In village is belonging to this parish Saint Francis Chapel.
