= Naramice =

- Village
- Location within Poland
- Coordinates: 51°18′N 18°26′E
- Country: Poland
- Voivodeship: Łódź
- County: Wieluń
- Gmina: Biała

Naramice [naraˈmit͡sɛ] is a village in the administrative district of Gmina Biała, within Wieluń County, Łódź Voivodeship, in central Poland.
