= Huby, Łódź Voivodeship =

Huby
- Village
- Location within Poland
- Coordinates: 51°14′09″N 18°24′39″E
- Country: Poland
- Voivodeship: Łódź
- County: Wieluń
- Gmina: Biała

Huby [ˈxubɨ] is a village in the administrative district of Gmina Biała, within Wieluń County, Łódź Voivodeship, in central Poland.
