= Mała Wieś, Mińsk County =

Mała Wieś
- Village
- Location within Poland
- Coordinates: 52°6′N 21°50′E
- Country: Poland
- Voivodeship: Masovian
- County: Mińsk
- Gmina: Mrozy
- Population: 364

Mała Wieś ([ˈmawa ˈvjɛɕ]) is a village in the administrative district of Gmina Mrozy, within Mińsk County, Masovian Voivodeship, in east-central Poland.
