= Wólka Wiciejowska =

- Village
- Location within Poland
- Coordinates: 52°9′N 21°40′E
- Country: Poland
- Voivodeship: Masovian
- County: Mińsk
- Gmina: Cegłów

Population
  - Total: 19
- Time zone: UTC+1 (CET)
  - Summer (DST): UTC+2 (CEST)

Wólka Wiciejowska [ˈvulka vit͡ɕɛˈjɔfska] is a village in the administrative district of Gmina Cegłów, within Mińsk County, Masovian Voivodeship, in east-central Poland.

Five Polish citizens were murdered by Nazi Germany in the village during World War II.
