= Cegłów, Mińsk County =

Cegłów
- town
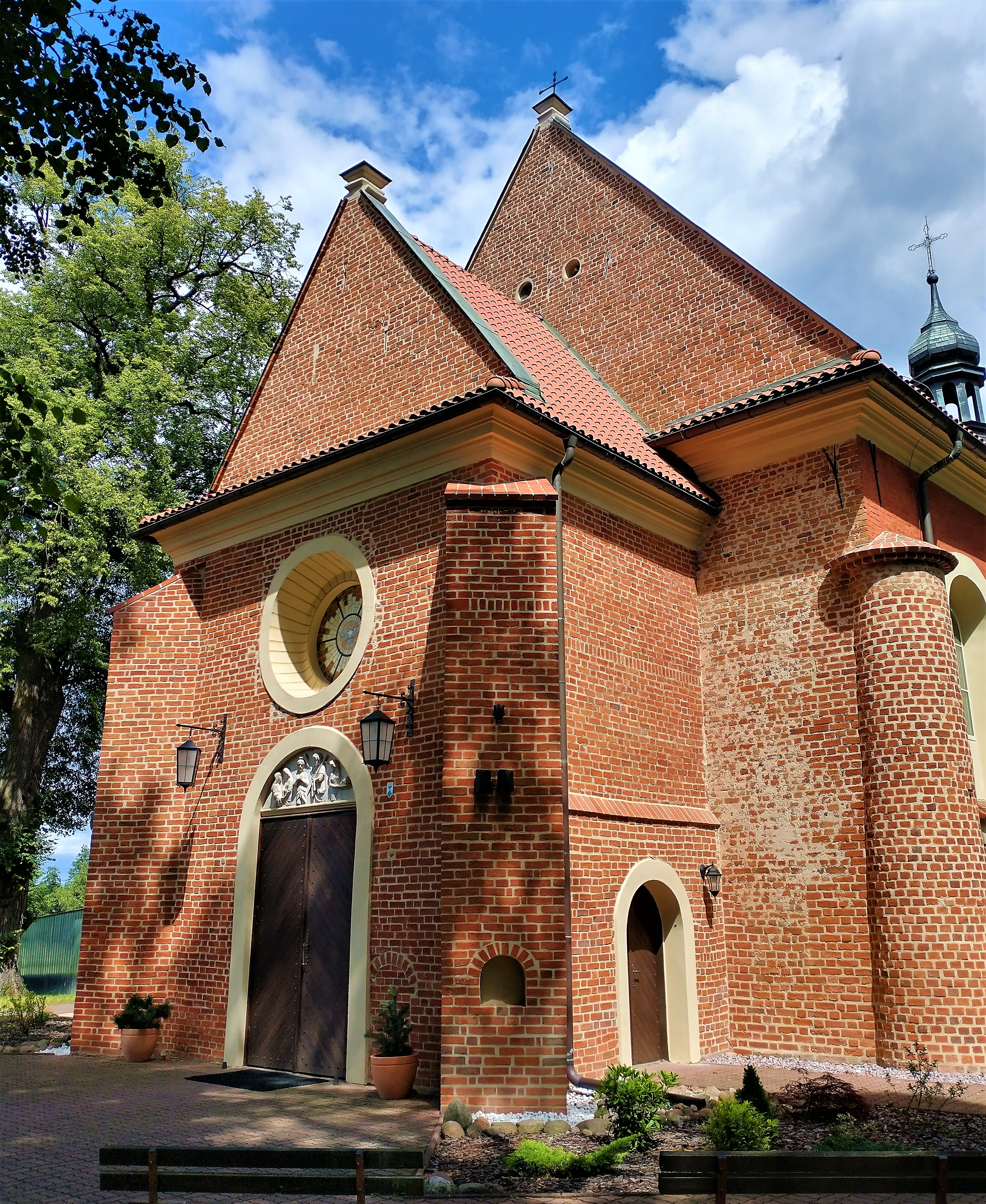
- Saint John the Baptist church in Cegłów

- Coat of arms

- Location within Poland
- Coordinates: 52°8′45″N 21°44′8″E
- Country: Poland
- Voivodeship: Masovian
- County: Mińsk
- Gmina: Cegłów
- Town rights: 1621

Population
  - Total: 2,109
- Time zone: UTC+1 (CET)
  - Summer (DST): UTC+2 (CEST)
- Vehicle registration: WM
- Website: Ceglow

Cegłów [ˈt͡sɛɡwuf] is a town in Mińsk County, Masovian Voivodeship, in east-central Poland. It is the seat of the gmina (administrative district) called Gmina Cegłów.

The town has a population of 2,109.

== History ==
Cegłów was granted town rights in 1621 by Polish King Sigismund III Vasa.

In the early 20th century, a Mariavite parish was established in Cegłów, the second after Płock.

Following the joint German-Soviet invasion of Poland, which started World War II in September 1939, Cegłów was occupied by Germany. In December 1939, some expelled Poles from Ostrzeszów were deported to Cegłów. Local Polish railwaymen gave shelter to many Jews who escaped from transports to the Treblinka extermination camp. Polish railwaymen and Jewish escapees jointly carried out acts of sabotage on the Mińsk Mazowiecki-Mrozy railroad, attacking German trains. On June 28, 1943, the German gendarmerie, SS and Gestapo cracked down on the resistance and murdered 26 Poles, including women and children, and an unknown number of Jewish escapees.

== Transport ==
The A2 motorway passes to the north of Cegłów.

Cegłów has a station on the Warsaw-Terespol railway line.

== Gallery ==
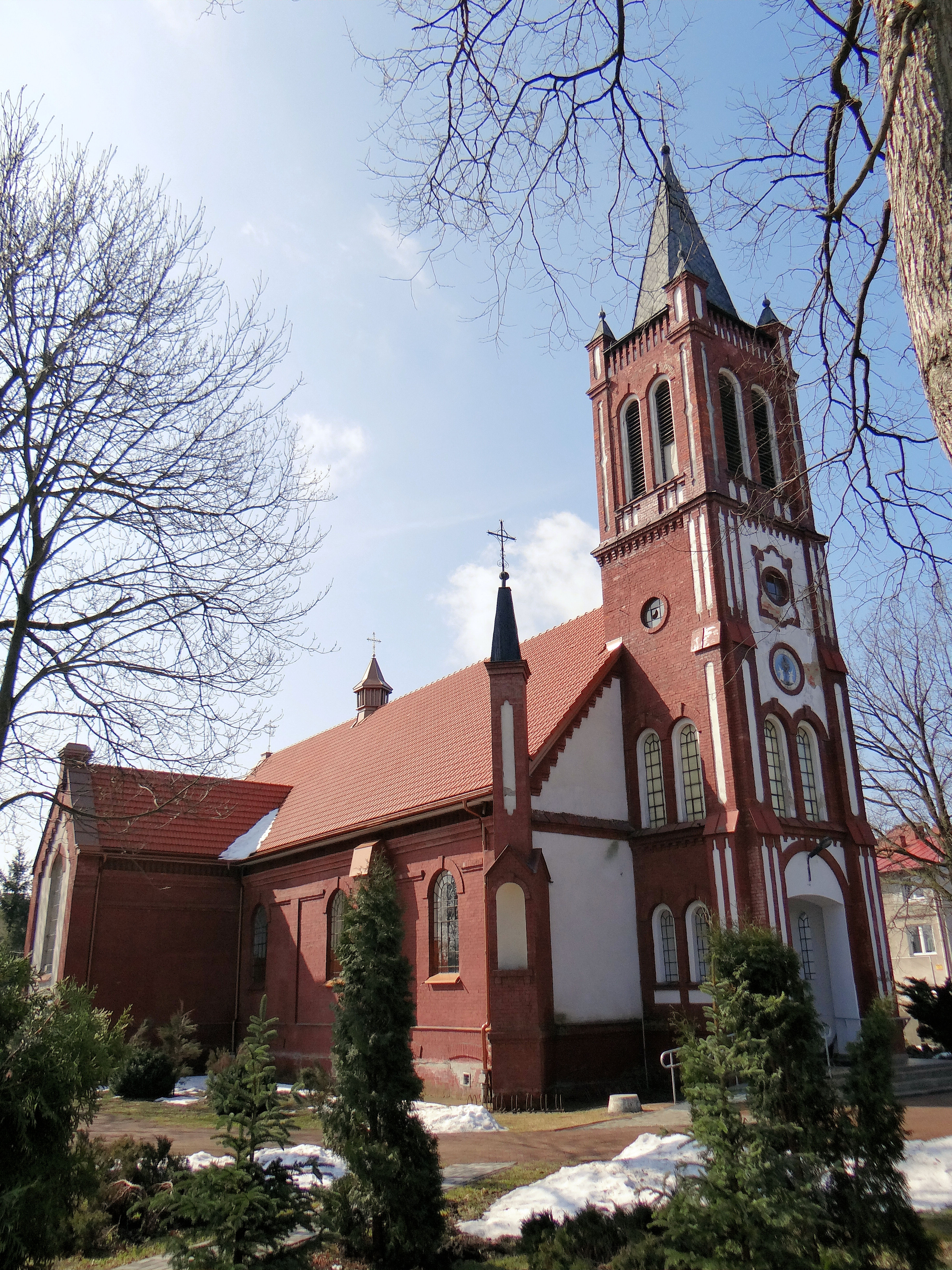
Mariavite Church

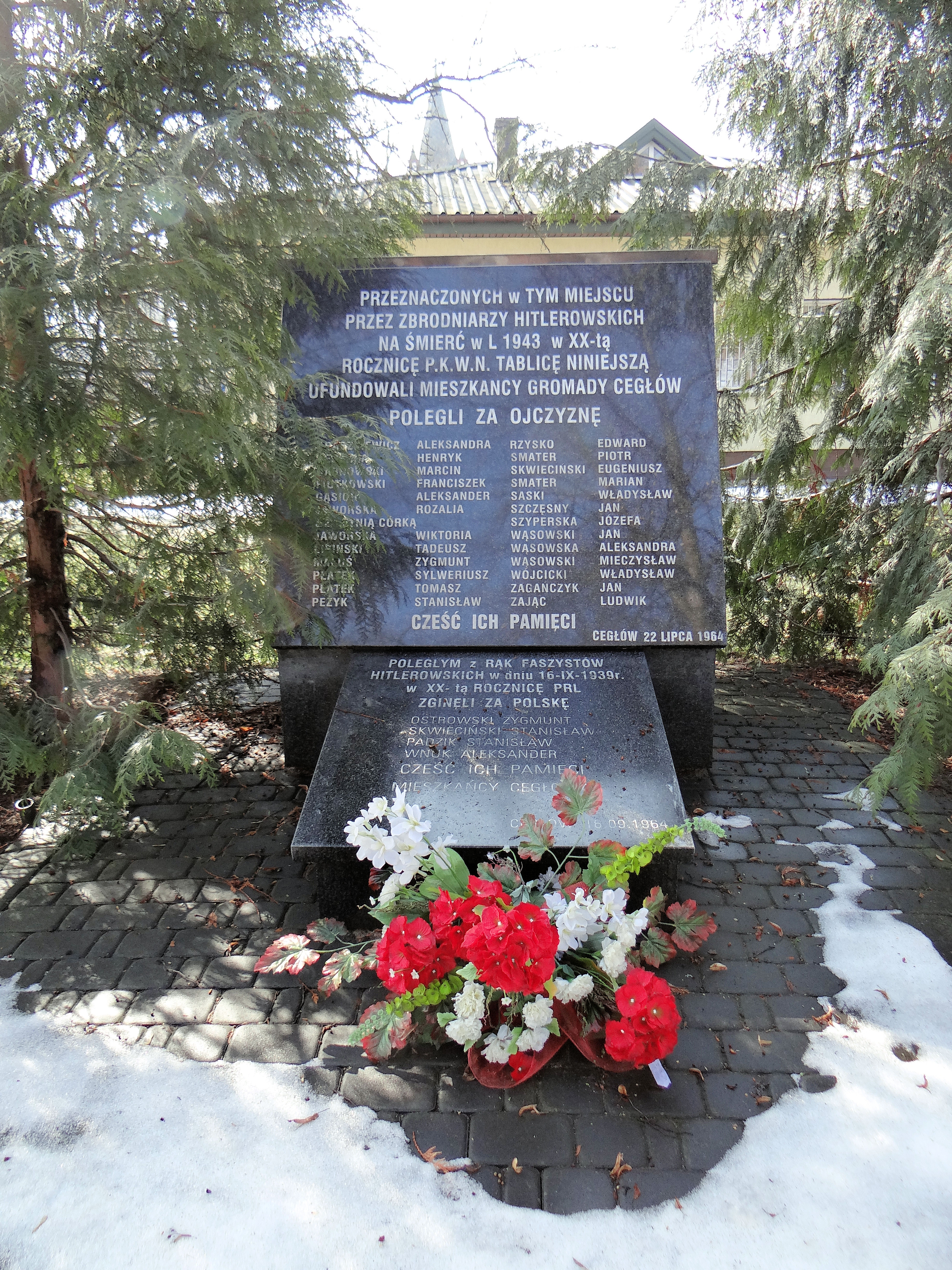
Memorial to local Polish victims of Nazi Germans

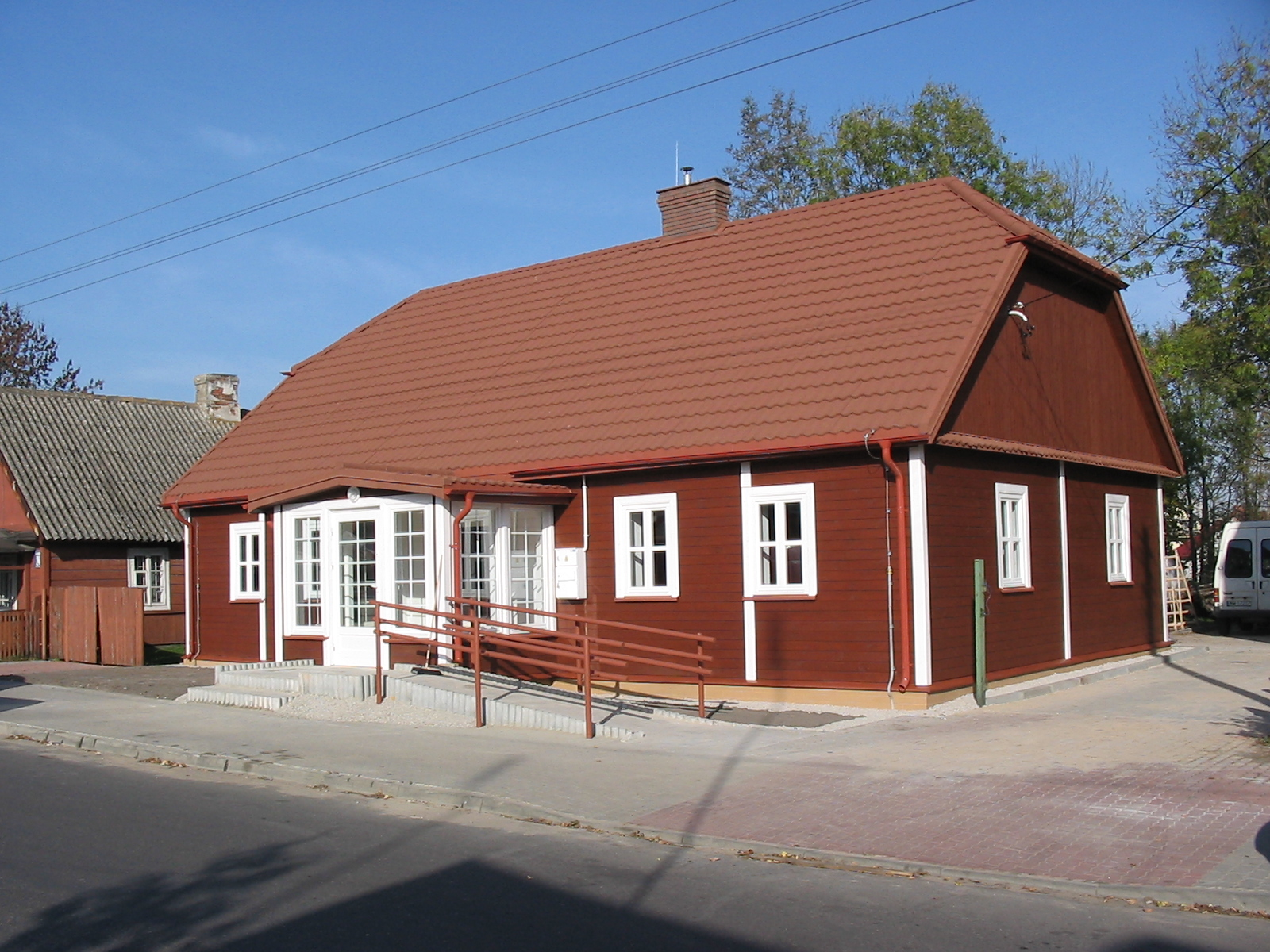
Library

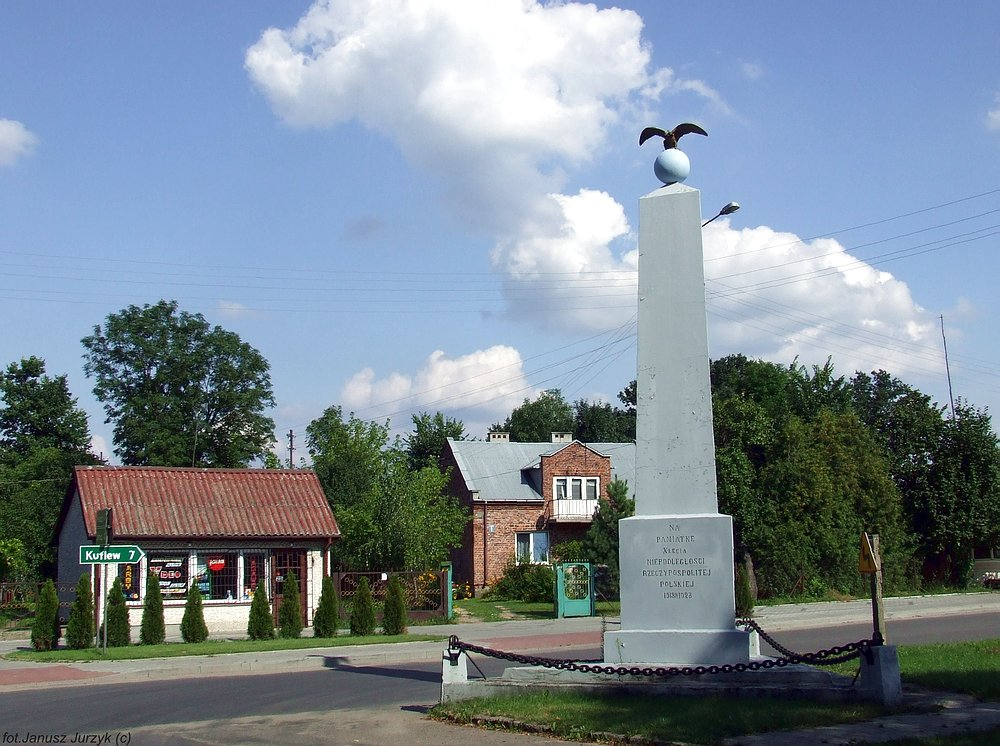
Polish Independence Memorial
