= Toporov =

The Russian-language surname Toporov (feminine: Toporova) is derived from the word topor, "axe". The surname may refer to:

- Sergei Toporov (1971–2024), Russian football player and coach
- Vladimir Toporov (1928–2005), Russian philologist

== See also ==
- Topor (surname)
