= Zabłocie, Wieluń County =

Zabłocie
- Village
- Location within Poland
- Coordinates: 51°18′10″N 18°27′23″E
- Country: Poland
- Voivodeship: Łódź
- County: Wieluń
- Gmina: Biała

Zabłocie [zaˈbwɔt͡ɕɛ] is a village in the administrative district of Gmina Biała, within Wieluń County, Łódź Voivodeship, in central Poland.
