= Skupie, Mińsk County =

Skupie
- Village
- Location within Poland
- Coordinates: 52°5′N 21°45′E
- Country: Poland
- Voivodeship: Masovian
- County: Mińsk
- Gmina: Cegłów
- Population: 108

Skupie [ˈskupjɛ] is a village in the administrative district of Gmina Cegłów, within Mińsk County, Masovian Voivodeship, in east-central Poland.
