= Biała Parcela =

- Village
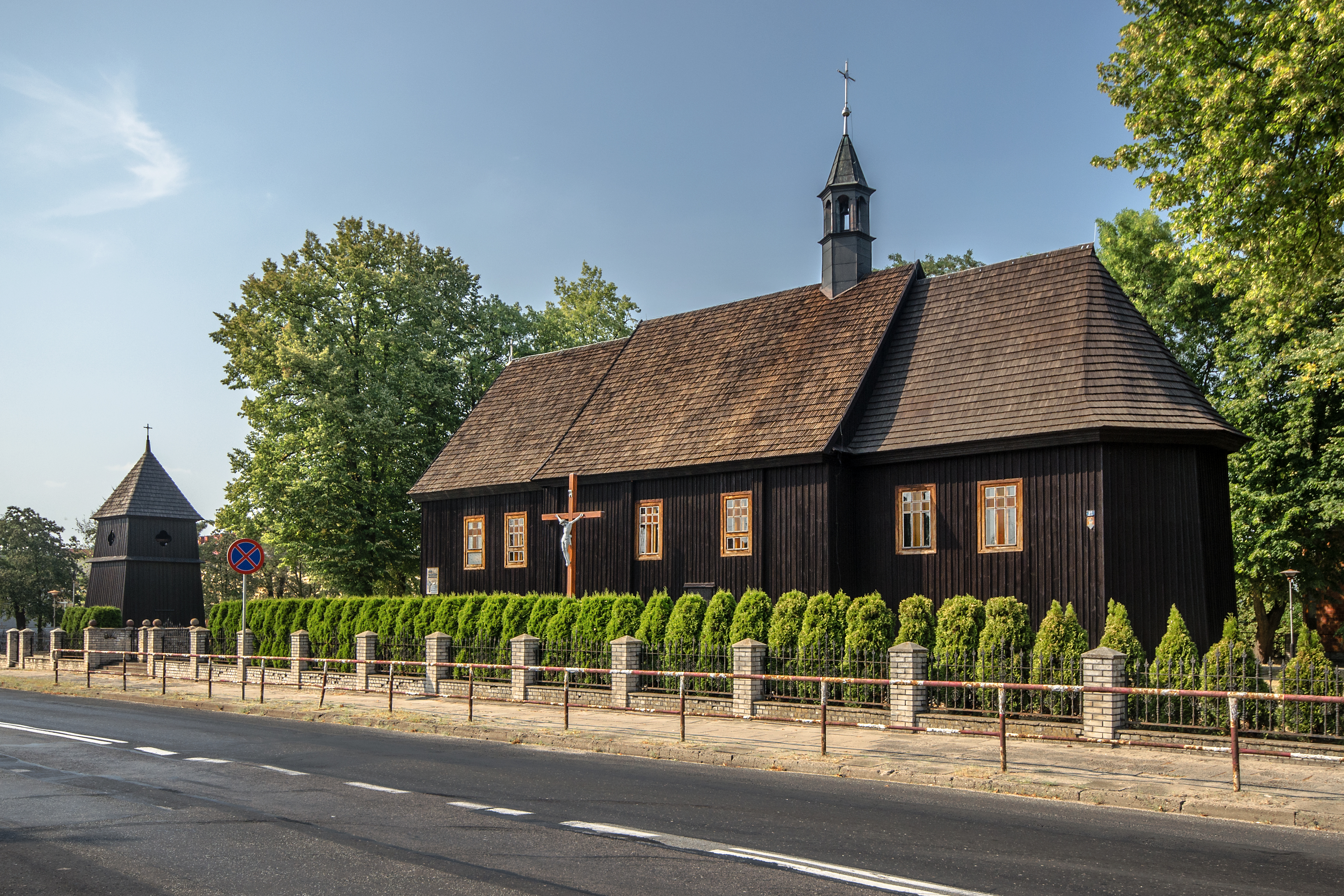
- Saint Peter in chains church in Biała Parcela

- Location within Poland
- Coordinates: 51°16′41″N 18°27′29″E
- Country: Poland
- Voivodeship: Łódź
- County: Wieluń
- Gmina: Biała
- Time zone: UTC+1 (CET)
  - Summer (DST): UTC+2 (CEST)
- Vehicle registration: EWI

Biała Parcela [ˈbjawa parˈt͡sɛla] is a village in the administrative district of Gmina Biała, within Wieluń County, Łódź Voivodeship, in south-central Poland.

== History ==
During the German occupation of Poland (World War II), in 1940, the German gendarmerie carried out expulsions of Poles, who were either enslaved as forced labour in the region or deported to the General Government in the more eastern part of German-occupied Poland. Houses and farms of expelled Poles were handed over to German colonists as part of the Lebensraum policy.
