= Łukówiec, Mińsk County =

Łukówiec
- Village
- Location within Poland
- Coordinates: 52°3′4″N 21°51′7″E
- Country: Poland
- Voivodeship: Masovian
- County: Mińsk
- Gmina: Mrozy
- Population: 284

Łukówiec [wuˈkuvjɛt͡s] is a village in the administrative district of Gmina Mrozy, within Mińsk County, Masovian Voivodeship, in east-central Poland.
