= Wola Paprotnia =

- Village
- Location within Poland
- Coordinates: 52°10′34″N 21°47′45″E
- Country: Poland
- Voivodeship: Masovian
- County: Mińsk
- Gmina: Mrozy
- Population: 198

Wola Paprotnia [ˈvɔla paˈprɔtɲa] is a village in the administrative district of Gmina Mrozy, within Mińsk County, Masovian Voivodeship, in east-central Poland.
