= Łyskornia =

- Village
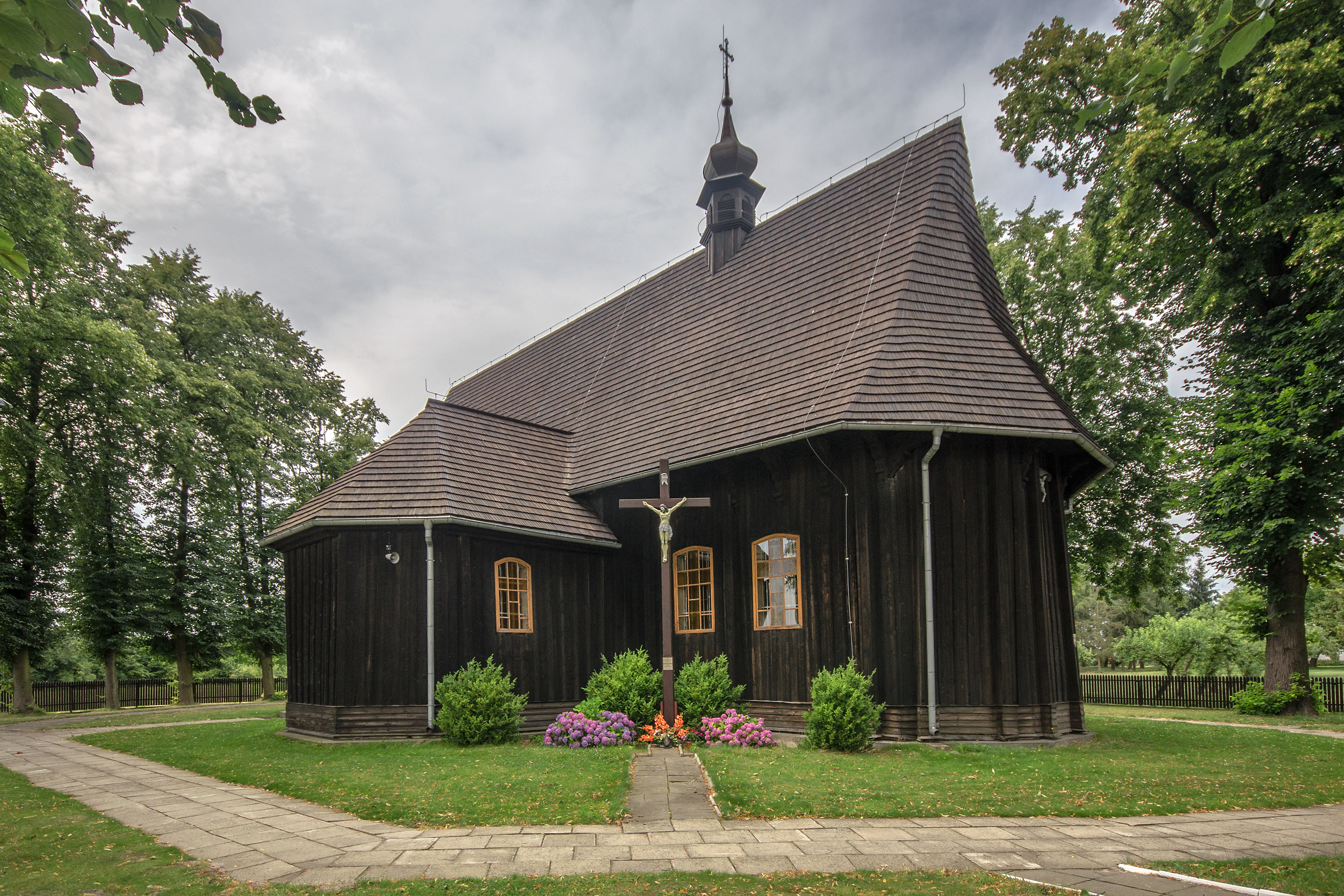
- Saint Mary Magdalene church in Łyskornia

- Location within Poland
- Coordinates: 51°16′N 18°24′E
- Country: Poland
- Voivodeship: Łódź
- County: Wieluń
- Gmina: Biała
- Time zone: UTC+1 (CET)
  - Summer (DST): UTC+2 (CEST)
- Vehicle registration: EWI

Łyskornia [wɨsˈkɔrɲa] is a village in the administrative district of Gmina Biała, within Wieluń County, Łódź Voivodeship, in south-central Poland.

== History ==
In 1827, Łyskornia had a population of 355.

During the German occupation of Poland (World War II), in 1940, the German gendarmerie expelled the entire population of Łyskornia. Expelled Poles were either enslaved as forced labour in the region or deported to the General Government in the more eastern part of German-occupied Poland. Their houses and farms were handed over to German colonists as part of the Lebensraum policy.
