= Huta Kuflewska =

Village in east-central Poland

- Village
- Location within Poland
- Coordinates: 52°6′12″N 21°47′1″E
- Country: Poland
- Voivodeship: Masovian
- County: Mińsk
- Gmina: Cegłów
- Population: 171

Huta Kuflewska [ˈxuta kuˈflɛfska] is a village in the administrative district of Gmina Cegłów, within Mińsk County, Masovian Voivodeship, in east-central Poland.
