= Piaseczno, Mińsk County =

Piaseczno
- Village
- Location within Poland
- Coordinates: 52°6′N 21°45′E
- Country: Poland
- Voivodeship: Masovian
- County: Mińsk
- Gmina: Cegłów
- Population: 295

Piaseczno [pjaˈsɛt͡ʂnɔ] is a village in the administrative district of Gmina Cegłów, within Mińsk County, Masovian Voivodeship, in east-central Poland.
