= Radomina =

- Village
- Location within Poland
- Coordinates: 51°16′54″N 18°24′28″E
- Country: Poland
- Voivodeship: Łódź
- County: Wieluń
- Gmina: Biała

Radomina [radɔˈmina] is a village in the administrative district of Gmina Biała, within Wieluń County, Łódź Voivodeship, in central Poland.
