= Biała, Wieluń County =

Biała
- Village
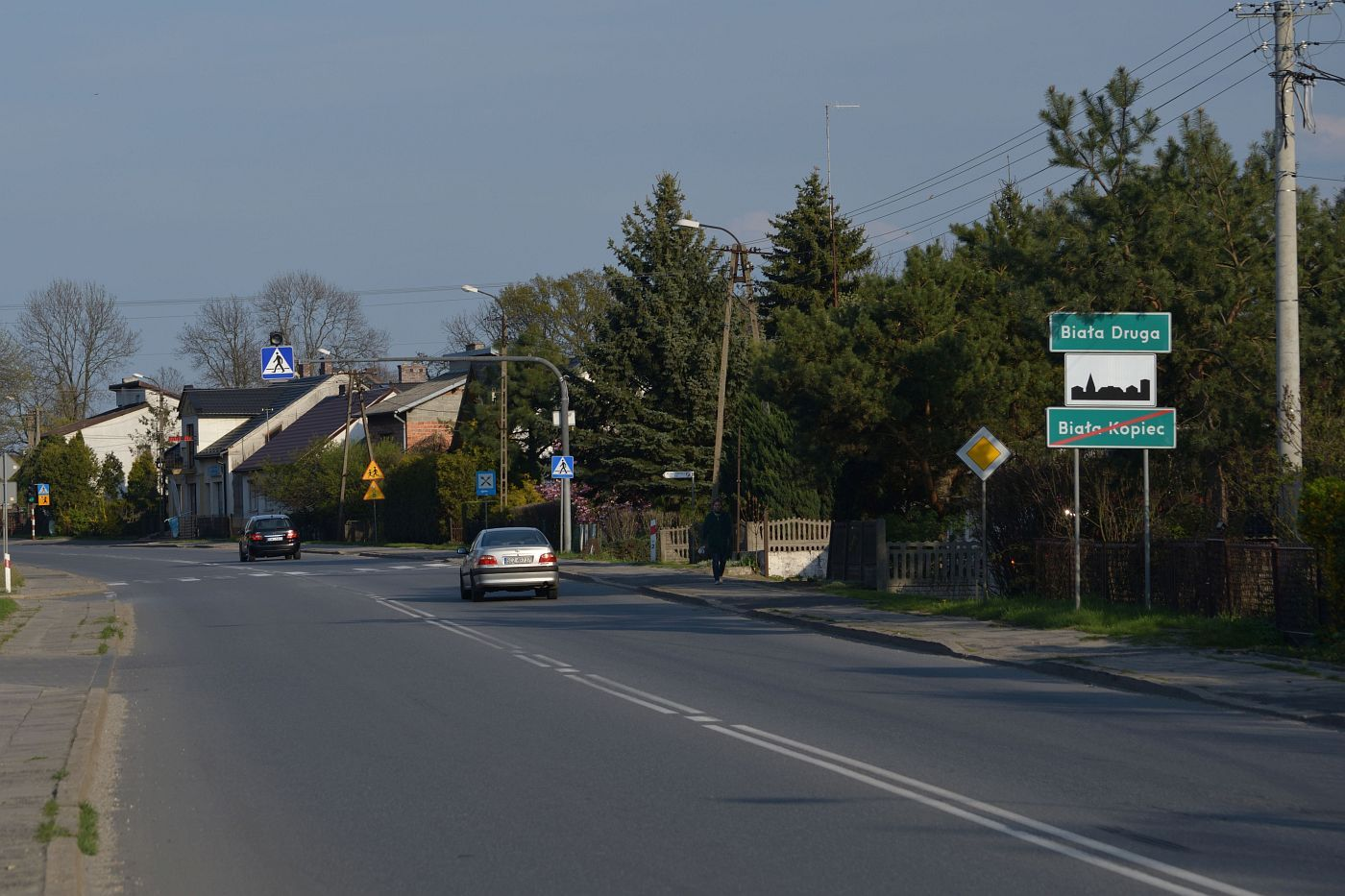

- Location within Poland
- Coordinates: 51°15′59″N 18°26′21″E
- Country: Poland
- Voivodeship: Łódź
- County: Wieluń
- Gmina: Biała
- Population: 333
- Time zone: UTC+1 (CET)
  - Summer (DST): UTC+2 (CEST)
- Vehicle registration: EWI

Biała [ˈbjawa] is a village in Wieluń County, Łódź Voivodeship, in south-central Poland. It is the seat of the gmina (administrative district) called Gmina Biała.

== History ==
In 1827, Biała had a population of 781.

During the German occupation of Poland (World War II), in 1940–1941, the German gendarmerie carried out expulsions of Poles, who were either deported to the General Government in the more eastern part of German-occupied Poland or enslaved as forced labour in the region or in Germany. Houses and farms of expelled Poles were handed over to German colonists as part of the Lebensraum policy.
