= Borki, Mińsk County =

Borki
- Village
- Location within Poland
- Coordinates: 52°05′42″N 21°54′25″E
- Country: Poland
- Voivodeship: Masovian
- County: Mińsk
- Gmina: Mrozy
- Population: 200

Borki [ˈbɔrki] is a village in the administrative district of Gmina Mrozy, within Mińsk County, Masovian Voivodeship, in east-central Poland.
