= Kiczki Pierwsze =

- Village
- Location within Poland
- Coordinates: 52°4′43″N 21°42′45″E
- Country: Poland
- Voivodeship: Masovian
- County: Mińsk
- Gmina: Cegłów
- Population: 233

Kiczki Pierwsze [ˈkit͡ʂki ˈpjɛrfʂɛ] is a village in the administrative district of Gmina Cegłów, within Mińsk County, Masovian Voivodeship, in east-central Poland.
