= Biała-Kopiec =

- Village
- Location within Poland
- Coordinates: 51°15′47″N 18°25′12″E
- Country: Poland
- Voivodeship: Łódź
- County: Wieluń
- Gmina: Biała

Biała-Kopiec [ˈbjawa ˈkɔpjɛt͡s] is a village in the administrative district of Gmina Biała, within Wieluń County, Łódź Voivodeship, in central Poland.
