= Skruda, Mińsk County =

Skruda
- Village
- Location within Poland
- Coordinates: 52°10′01″N 21°53′22″E
- Country: Poland
- Voivodeship: Masovian
- County: Mińsk
- Gmina: Mrozy
- Population: 106

Skruda [ˈskruda] is a village in the administrative district of Gmina Mrozy, within Mińsk County, Masovian Voivodeship, in east-central Poland.
