= Rudnik (surname) =

Rudnik is a surname. Notable people with the surname include:

- Barbara Rudnik (1958–2009), German actress
- Eugeniusz Rudnik (1932–2016), Polish composer, electronics engineer, and sound engineer
- Jakob Rudnik (1894–1963), Ukrainian communist
- Raphael Rudnik (1933–2009), American poet
