= Mrozy, Mińsk County =

Mrozy
- Town
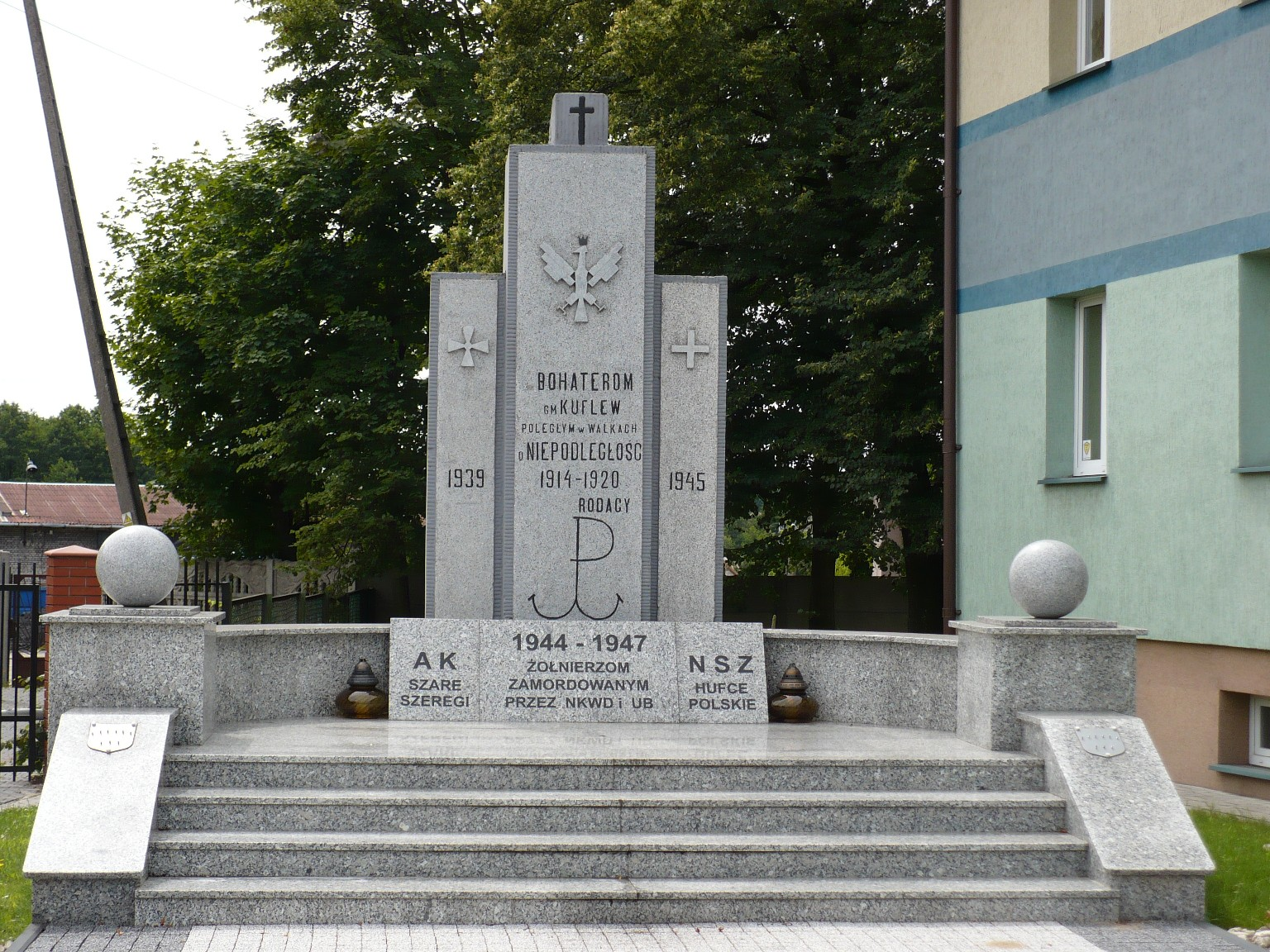
- Monument commemorating the fallen in the fights for Polish independence

- Coat of arms

- Location within Poland
- Coordinates: 52°9′58″N 21°48′8″E
- Country: Poland
- Voivodeship: Masovian
- County: Mińsk
- Gmina: Mrozy

Population
  - Total: 3,524
- Time zone: UTC+1 (CET)
  - Summer (DST): UTC+2 (CEST)
- Vehicle registration: WM
- Website: http://www.mrozy.pl/

Mrozy [ˈmrɔzɨ] is a town in Mińsk County, Masovian Voivodeship, in east-central Poland. It is the seat of the gmina (administrative district) called Gmina Mrozy.

The town has a population of 3,524.

== History ==
During the German occupation of Poland (World War II), in December 1939, some expelled Poles from Ostrzeszów were deported to Mrozy. Two local Polish railwaymen were captured by the Germans for rescuing Jews from the Holocaust and imprisoned in nearby Mińsk Mazowiecki, where they were eventually liberated by the Polish resistance.

== Transport ==
The A2 motorway passes to the north of Mrozy.

Mrozy has a station on the line connecting Warsaw-Terespol railway line.

Mrozy Horse Tram

== Sports ==
The local football club is Watra Mrozy. It competes in the lower leagues.
