= Rososz, Łódź Voivodeship =

Rososz
- Village
- Location within Poland
- Coordinates: 51°19′N 18°27′E
- Country: Poland
- Voivodeship: Łódź
- County: Wieluń
- Gmina: Biała

Rososz [ˈrɔsɔʂ] is a village in the administrative district of Gmina Biała, within Wieluń County, Łódź Voivodeship, in central Poland.
