= Grzegorz Kołacz =

Polish politician

member of Sejm 2005-2007
- In office 25 September 2005 – ?

Personal details
- Born: 20 September 1966 (age 59)
- Party: Samoobrona

Grzegorz Kołacz (born 20 September 1966 in Nowa Ruda) is a Polish politician. She was elected to Sejm on 25 September 2005, getting 6904 votes in 2 Wałbrzych district as a candidate from the Samoobrona Rzeczpospolitej Polskiej list.

== See also ==
- Members of Polish Sejm 2005-2007
