= Biała Pierwsza, Łódź Voivodeship =

Biała Pierwsza
- Village
- Location within Poland
- Coordinates: 51°16′36″N 18°25′42″E
- Country: Poland
- Voivodeship: Łódź
- County: Wieluń
- Gmina: Biała

Biała Pierwsza [ˈbjawa ˈpjɛrfʂa] is a village in the administrative district of Gmina Biała, within Wieluń County, Łódź Voivodeship, in central Poland.
