= Elynor Rudnick =

American aircraft pilot (1923–1996)

- Born: Elynor H. Rudnick; April 2, 1923; Central California
- Died: May 25, 1996 (aged 73)
- Occupation: Aircraft pilot

Elynor H. "Johnnie" Rudnick (April 2, 1923 – May 25, 1996) was an aviation pioneer. She was the first female president of the Helicopter Association of America (HAA), first female president of Helicopter Association International, treasurer of the California Helicopter Association, a flight school owner and instructor, aviation business owner, aviator, and airplane restorer. She founded Bakersfield Air Park and Kern Copters, Inc. and helped organize Helicopter Association International. She was also considered an expert in aviation-assisted agricultural spraying.

== Early life ==
Rudnick was born to Oscar Rudnick (1892-1959) and Libbie Berman Rudnick (1892-1951) on a cattle ranch in Central California. She was the fifth of the couple's eleven children which included brothers Milton (1927-2015), Marcus, Philip, Robert, and Samuel (1921-1997), and sisters Bertha, Miriam, Loretta, Sylvia, and Florence. Her father had come to the country in order to escape Czarist Russia. He sold housewares in New York before making his way to California, where he met Libbie Berman. The two married and began raising their family, settling in Bakersfield, California. The couple "founded, developed, and managed a livestock and agribusiness industry of major importance to the economy of Kern County." Rudnick as well as one of her brothers, Marcus, became decorated equestrians; she earned the title of Miss Kern County for the years 1939 and 1940 during the county's annual Pioneer Days.

== Education ==
Rudnick's father, like many of his generation and region of origin, did not believe in women pursuing schooling and hence refused to pay for his daughter's collegiate aspirations (Can We Talk ? podcast, 4:03, 4:25) Rudnick defied her father's dismissal of her desire to pursue higher education, however, and went about securing work for herself so she could pay her own way through school. She was 19 years old at the time. The position she found involved working at Douglas Aircraft in Los Angeles on an assembly line for military plane construction. (Can We Talk ? podcast, 4:38). She also spent time at an airport in Silverlake, Los Angeles. This enabled her to pay her tuition for her school of choice, UCLA.

It was at UCLA where she took a course in aviation mechanics, which, along with her assembly line work, was a precursor to her newfound desire to join the Women Air Force Service Pilots (WASPs), a civilian corps of pilots that delivered planes and cargo during World War II. As she was under age 21, she could not join the WASPs without her parents' signatures. Her father called her crazy for wanting to join and refused to allow it, but she repeatedly pressed the matter until he told her she should go and ask her mother. Rudnick did so, finessing the situation by telling her mother that if she signed, so would her father. He had not agreed to this, but Rudnick's mother signed, leaving the father no choice but to allow his daughter to do as she pleased. She subsequently attended flight school at Lone Pine and Silverlake, earning her license, but the war was at its tail end, and the WASPs were involuntarily disbanded--"legislated out of existence"—before Rudnick could get off the waiting list of women interested in and eligible for joining. As a consolation, Rudnick decided to combine some money with two of her brothers and purchase an air strip, which was how she came to found Bakersfield Air Park.

== Businesses ==
In 1945, at age 22, Rudnick applied and earned the Kern County Board of Supervisors' approval to open her own private air field, which she named Bakersfield Air Park, the air park's sign reading "Elynor Rudnick's Bakersfield Air Park." (Dissolve.com video, 00:12) It was located on South Union Avenue, adjacent to Highway 99 on 120 acres. The same year, the Bakersfield press profiled her, stating that "Elynor Rudnick is probably the youngest woman in the United States to open a private flying field and among the first to launch such a project." The piece also reported that "she has bought army corps planes that have been put up for sale, fixed them up mechanically and resold them at a profit" and that Rudnick "represents feminine initiative in aviation development and has the courage to match her dreams."

Rudnick went on to found and serve as president of one of the first helicopter companies in the world, Kern Copters, Inc., in Bakersfield, which she ran with Bob Facer, and Rudnick Helicopters Ltd. in New Zealand. She also founded a flight school at her air field in 1948. She continued to buy and sell aircraft, such as Ryan Navions by Ryan Aeronautical Company. The company considered Rudnick, among a handful of women, as playing "an outstanding part" in the models' sales, and one of the "feminine standard bearers" in doing so.

In 1955, Rudnick became the first woman president ever of Helicopter Association International. In 1948, she had previously helped found the organization and served as its first treasurer. The organization would receive recognition in its tenure, such as a celebratory luncheon in 1956, hosted by the Bay Area Aviation Commission.

In 1947 (or earlier), Rudnick became a member of the Bakersfield Chapter of the Ninety-Nines, Inc., the International Organization of Women Pilots. In its directory, she and other members are listed as Whirly-Girls.

=== Government surveys ===
At some point in her career, Rudnick served as a contractor for the United States government, partaking in geological surveys and oil exploration on the north slope of Alaska.

=== Court case ===
In 1948, Rudnick, a "dedicated 'offshore' volunteer," established flight training at her air field for Jews living in Palestine. Thirteen fighter pilots, who became the first pilots of the nascent Israeli Air Force, were trained at her school. Furthermore, she became involved in a plan hatched by others to smuggle airplane parts overseas, which was a violation of the Federal Neutrality Act. The scandal broke in 1949, and Rudnick along with eight others involved were convicted and fined for the transgression. In Rudnick's case, she was charged with conspiracy to defraud the War Assets Administration. The case was declassified in 2013.

== Marriage ==
Elynor married David Falk, a former medic with the U.S. Army Medical Corps, who became a doctor in private practice after World War II, and additionally, chief of the Department of Urology at Kern County General Hospital in Bakersfield.

== Bibliography ==
- The Story of Kern Copters, Inc. (1956)

== Awards and honors ==
In 1939 Camp-West-Lowe bestowed Rudnick with the honorific of Cowgirl.

In 2016 the Jewish Women's Archive dedicated the entire first episode of their podcast Can We Talk? to Rudnick and aviator Zoharah Leviatov; the episode is called "The Pilot's Pilot."

== Death and legacy ==
Rudnick died in 1996 at age 73. She is buried at Greenlawn Cemetery and Mortuary in Bakersfield, California. Her gravestone reads "Free Spirit." During her life as well as posthumously, Rudnick's aviation fortune was and continues to be used philanthropically:

Rudnick and husband David Falk established the Harold C. Wiggers Endowed Scholarship Fund at Albany Medical Center in 1975. It had "one-half for providing financial assistance to medical students who are graduates of Union College; and the other one-half for providing financial assistance to students in any course of study who are graduates of any undergraduate institution, including but not limited to Union College." The fund is still in operation as of 2020.

In 1977, Rudnick donated the Land Office at the Kern County Museum.

In 2007, Rudnick's husband, David Falk, established the David Falk and Elynor Rudnick-Falk Professorship in Engineering at Union College. In 2012, Falk donated $500,000 from Rudnick's estate to the Kern Community Foundation, a public charity, "to honor the memory of [Rudnick's] parents in perpetuity." The donation was given in order to establish The Oscar and Libbie Rudnick Scholarship Fund, which now "provide[s] scholarships to U.S. citizens who are current or former residents of Kern County" and which "support[s] Kern’s future with resources to help students achieve their academic goals."

In 2019, in a comment to the Jewish Journal, Rudnick's brother, Robert (Bob) stated that he and Jeff Silbar are writing a musical about Elynor's life.
