= Rudnik, Szczecin =

Neighbourhood of Szczecin, Poland

Rudnik is a part of the Szczecin City, Poland situated on the right bank of Oder river, east of the Szczecin Old Town, and Szczecin-Dąbie.
