= Skwarne =

- Village
- Location within Poland
- Coordinates: 52°8′N 21°46′E
- Country: Poland
- Voivodeship: Masovian
- County: Mińsk
- Gmina: Cegłów

Population
  - Total: 103
- Time zone: UTC+1 (CET)
  - Summer (DST): UTC+2 (CEST)

Skwarne [ˈskfarnɛ] is a village in the administrative district of Gmina Cegłów, within Mińsk County, Masovian Voivodeship, in east-central Poland.

Six Polish citizens were murdered by Nazi Germany in the village during World War II.
