= Rudnik pri Radomljah =

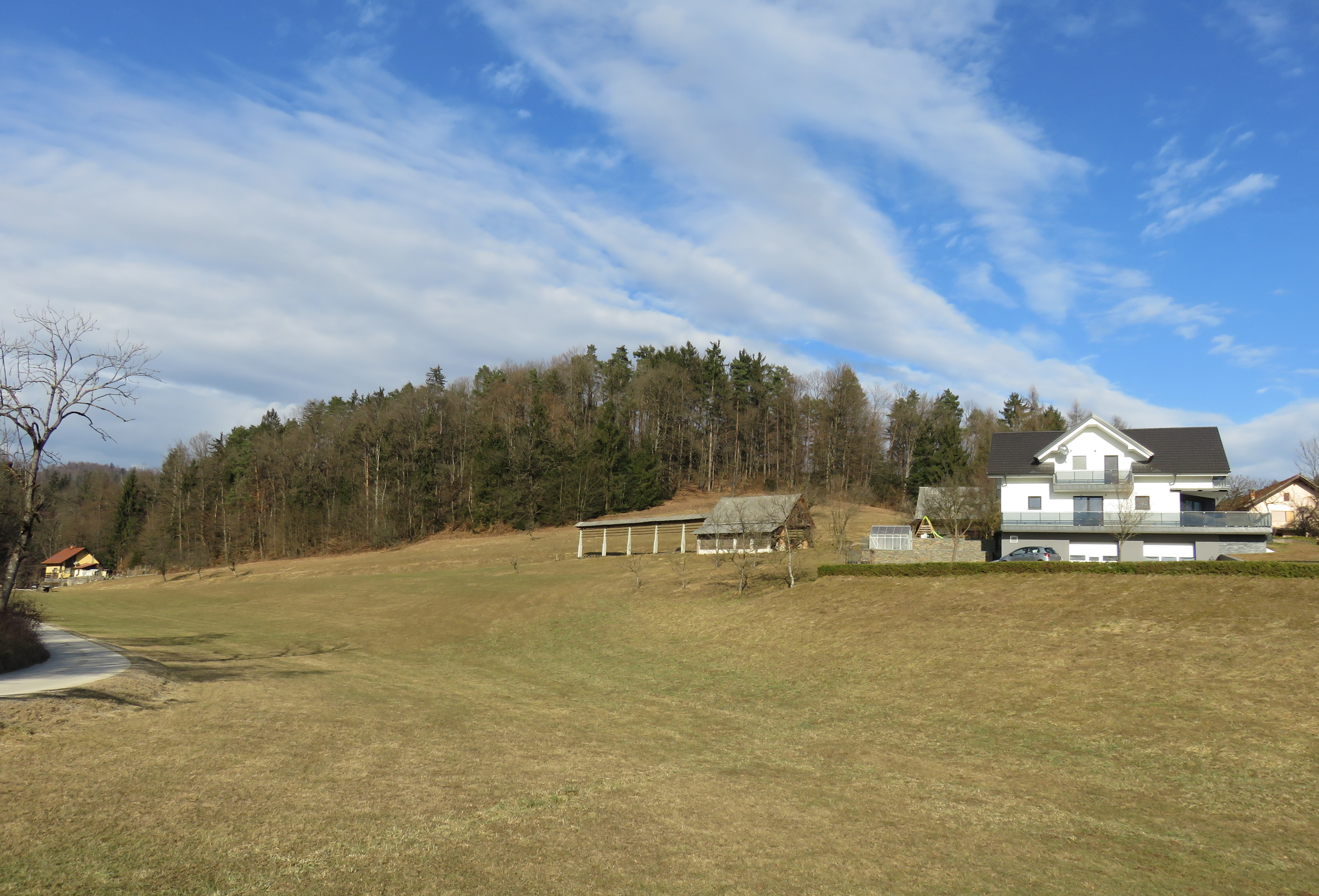

- Location in Slovenia
- Coordinates: 46°11′52.05″N 14°37′38.49″E
- Country: Slovenia
- Traditional region: Upper Carniola
- Statistical region: Central Slovenia
- Municipality: Kamnik

Area
  - Total: 2.69 km^{2} (1.04 sq mi)
- Elevation: 377.8 m (1,240 ft)

Population (2002)
  - Total: 50

Rudnik pri Radomljah (pronounced [ˈɾuːdnik pɾi ˈɾaːdɔmljax]) is a dispersed settlement of isolated small farms on the hills above Volčji Potok in the Municipality of Kamnik in the Upper Carniola region of Slovenia.

== Name ==
Rudnik pri Radomljah was attested in written sources as Ruͤdnik in 1359. The name of the settlement was changed from Rudnik to Rudnik pri Radomljah (literally, 'Rudnik near Radomlje') in 1955.
