= Lubomin, Gmina Mrozy =

Lubomin
- Village
- Location within Poland
- Coordinates: 52°08′04″N 21°49′35″E
- Country: Poland
- Voivodeship: Masovian
- County: Mińsk
- Gmina: Mrozy
- Population: 97

Lubomin [luˈbɔmin] is a village in the administrative district of Gmina Mrozy, within Mińsk County, Masovian Voivodeship, in east-central Poland.
