= Gmina Biała, Łódź Voivodeship =

Gmina Biała Biała Commune
- Gmina

- Coat of arms
- Interactive map of Gmina Biała
- Coordinates (Biała): 51°15′59″N 18°26′21″E
- Country: Poland
- Voivodeship: Łódź
- County: Wieluń
- Seat: Biała

Area
  - Total: 74.99 km^{2} (28.95 sq mi)

Population (2006)
  - Total: 5,503
  - Density: 73.38/km^{2} (190.1/sq mi)
- Time zone: UTC+1 (CET)
  - Summer (DST): UTC+2 (CEST)
- Website: gminabiala.pl

Gmina Biała is a rural gmina (administrative district) in Wieluń County, Łódź Voivodeship, in central Poland. Its seat is the village of Biała, which lies approximately 11 kilometres (7 mi) north-west of Wieluń and 92 km (57 mi) south-west of the regional capital Łódź.

The gmina covers an area of 74.99 square kilometres (29.0 sq mi), and as of 2006 its total population is 5,503.

== Villages ==
Gmina Biała contains the villages and settlements of:

- Biała Parcela
- Biała Pierwsza
- Biała Rządowa
- Biała-Kopiec
- Brzoza
- Huby
- Janowiec
- Klapka
- Kopydłów
- Łyskornia
- Młynisko
- Naramice
- Radomina
- Rososz
- Śmiecheń
- Wiktorów
- Zabłocie

== Neighbouring gminas ==
Gmina Biała is bordered by the gminas of Czarnożyły, Czastary, Łubnice, Lututów, Skomlin, Sokolniki and Wieluń.
