= Rudnik, Kraśnik County =

Rudnik
- Village
- Location within Poland
- Coordinates: 50°57′49″N 22°19′25″E
- Country: Poland
- Voivodeship: Lublin
- County: Kraśnik
- Gmina: Wilkołaz
- Population: 280

Rudnik (Polish pronunciation: [ˈrudɲik]) is a village in the administrative district of Gmina Wilkołaz, within Kraśnik County, Lublin Voivodeship, in eastern Poland.
