= Rudnik, Mińsk County =

Rudnik
- Village
- Location within Poland
- Coordinates: 52°10′N 21°46′E
- Country: Poland
- Voivodeship: Masovian
- County: Mińsk
- Gmina: Cegłów
- Population: 148

Rudnik (Polish pronunciation: [ˈrudɲik]) is a village in the administrative district of Gmina Cegłów, within Mińsk County, Masovian Voivodeship, in east-central Poland.
