= Wiktorów, Wieluń County =

Wiktorów
- Village
- Location within Poland
- Coordinates: 51°17′N 18°28′E
- Country: Poland
- Voivodeship: Łódź
- County: Wieluń
- Gmina: Biała

Wiktorów [vikˈtɔruf] is a village in the administrative district of Gmina Biała, within Wieluń County, Łódź Voivodeship, in central Poland.
