= Kołacz, Masovian Voivodeship =

Kołacz
- Village
- Location within Poland
- Coordinates: 52°5′N 21°50′E
- Country: Poland
- Voivodeship: Masovian
- County: Mińsk
- Gmina: Mrozy
- Population: 58

Kołacz [ˈkɔwat͡ʂ] is a village in the administrative district of Gmina Mrozy, within Mińsk County, Masovian Voivodeship, in east-central Poland.
