= Rososz, Mińsk County =

Rososz
- Village
- Location within Poland
- Coordinates: 52°7′N 21°42′E
- Country: Poland
- Voivodeship: Masovian
- County: Mińsk
- Gmina: Cegłów
- Population: 81

Rososz [ˈrɔsɔʂ] is a village in the administrative district of Gmina Cegłów, within Mińsk County, Masovian Voivodeship, in east-central Poland.
