= Rudnik, Racibórz County =

Rudnik
- Village
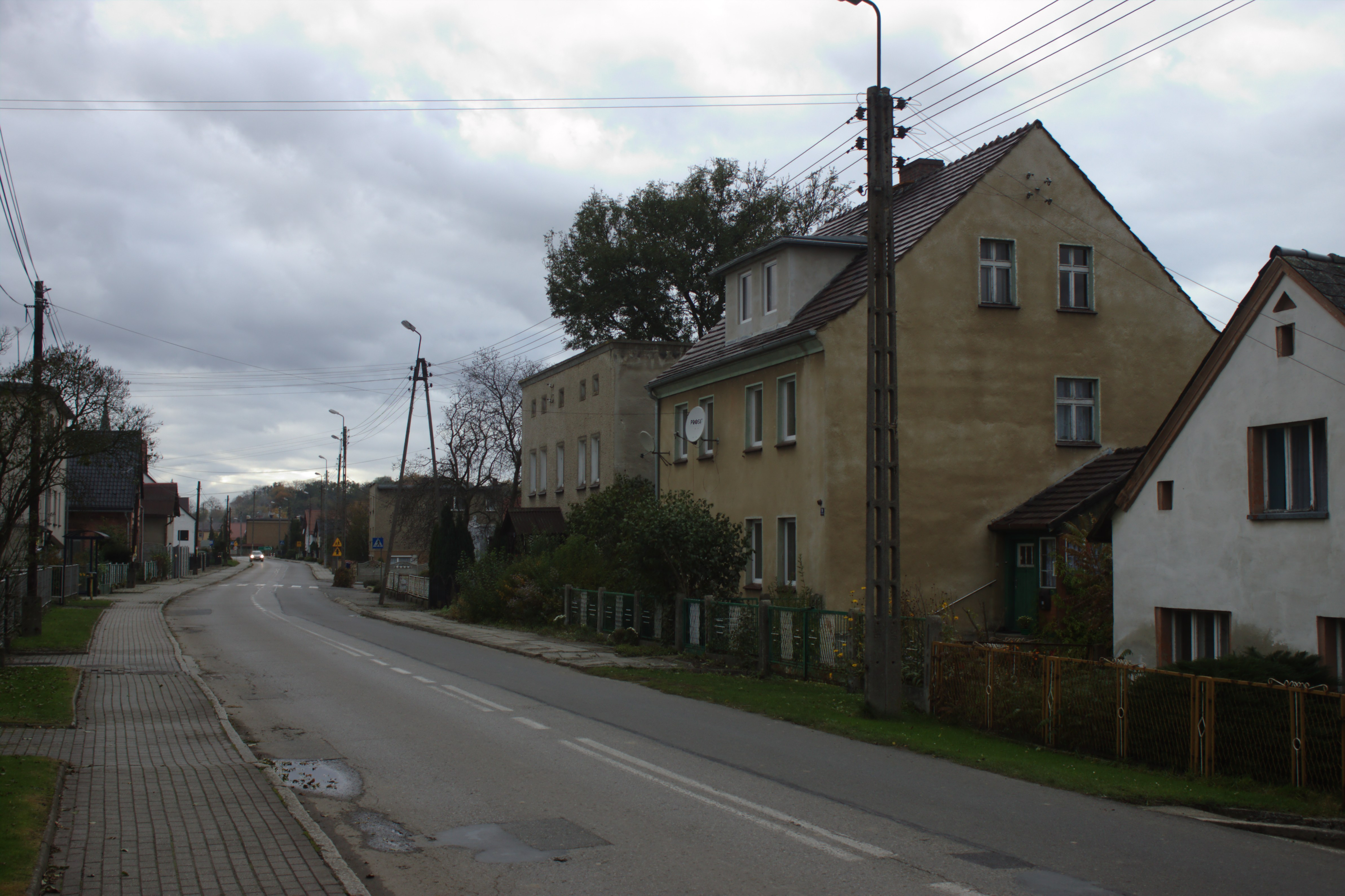
- Road

- Location within Poland
- Coordinates: 50°7′43″N 18°11′1″E
- Country: Poland
- Voivodeship: Silesian
- County: Racibórz
- Gmina: Rudnik
- Population: 850

Rudnik (Polish pronunciation: [ˈrudɲik]) is a village in Racibórz County, Silesian Voivodeship, in southern Poland. It is the seat of the gmina (administrative district) called Gmina Rudnik.

Gallery

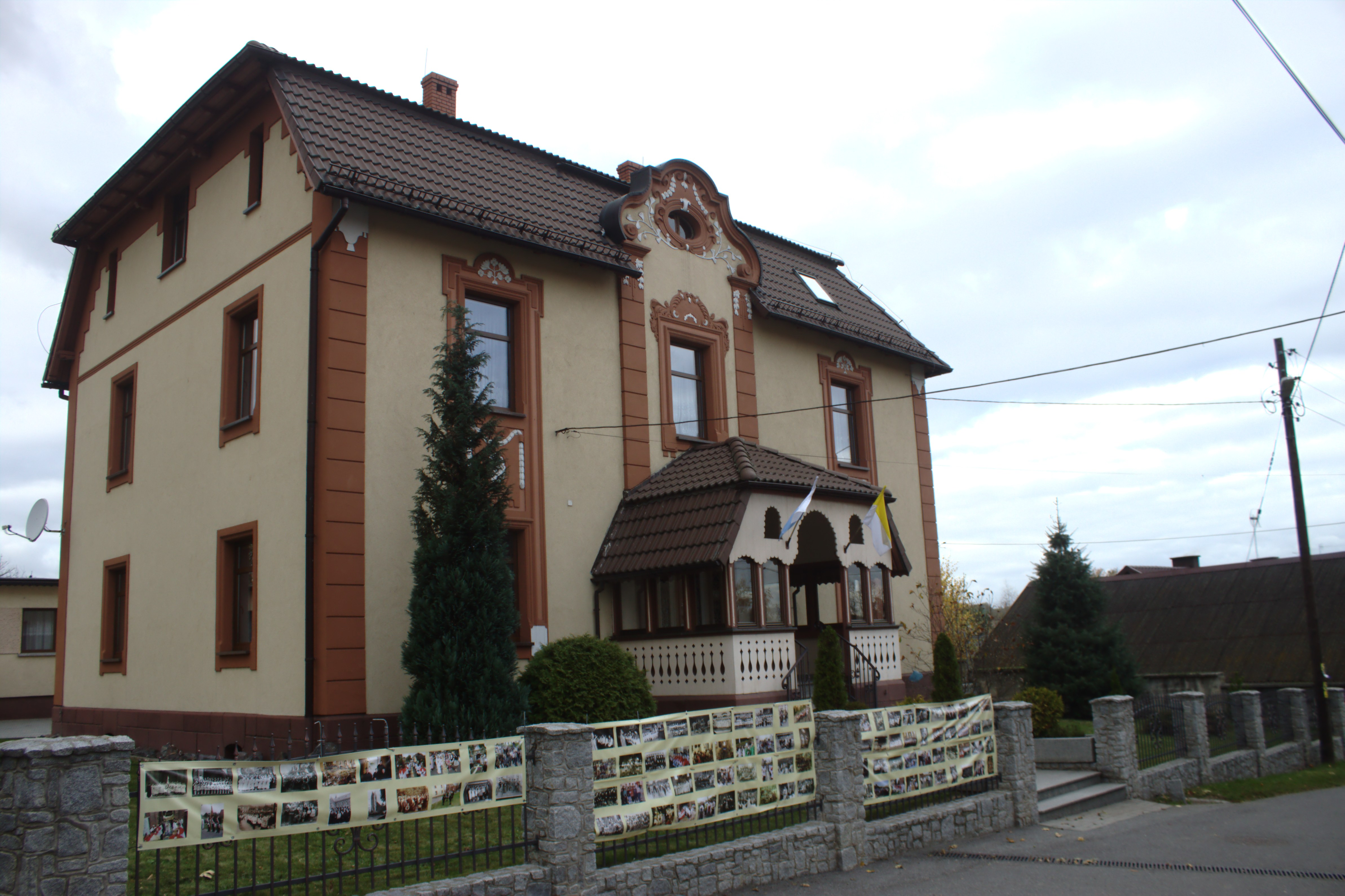
Rectory

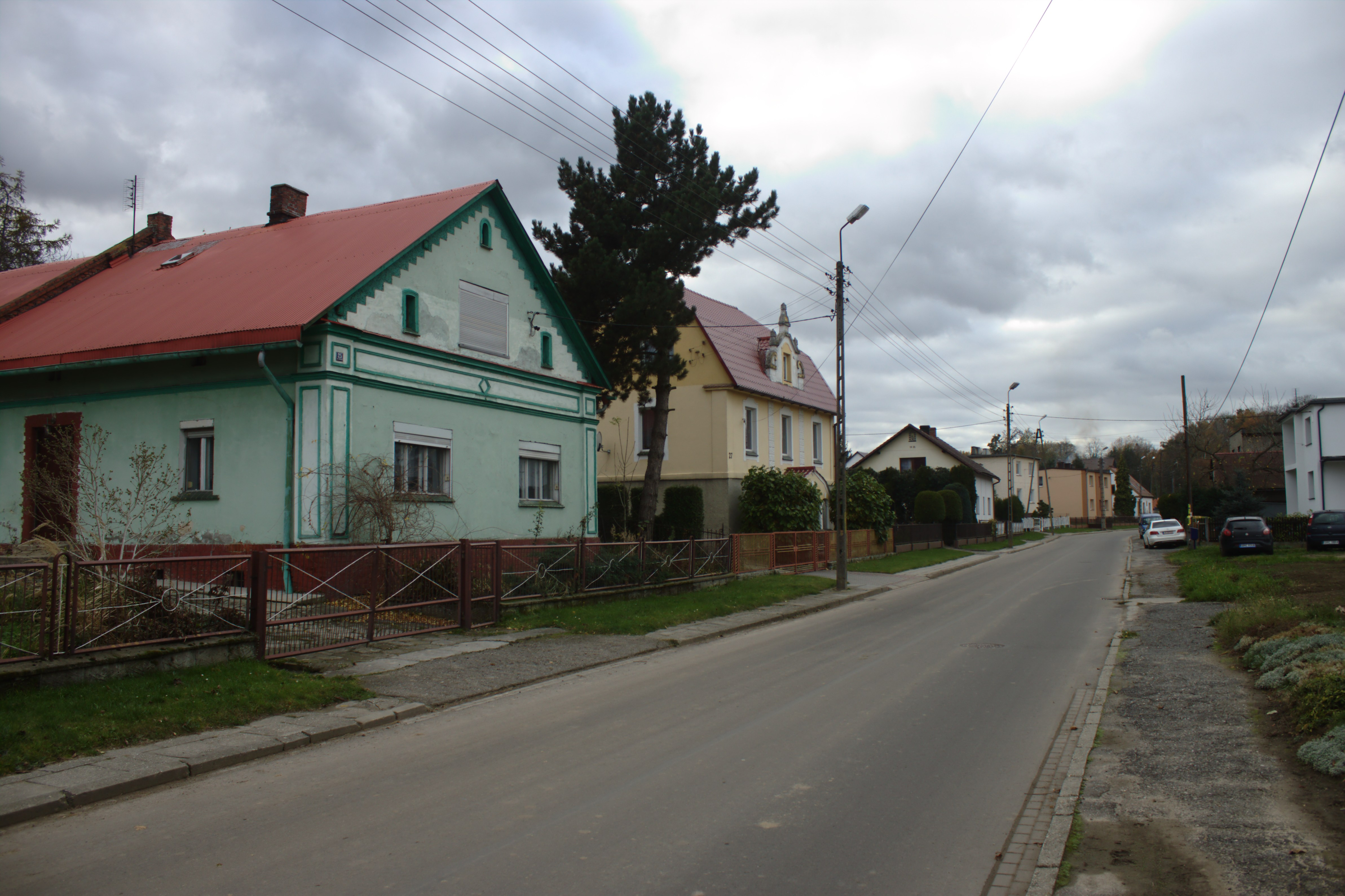
Houses

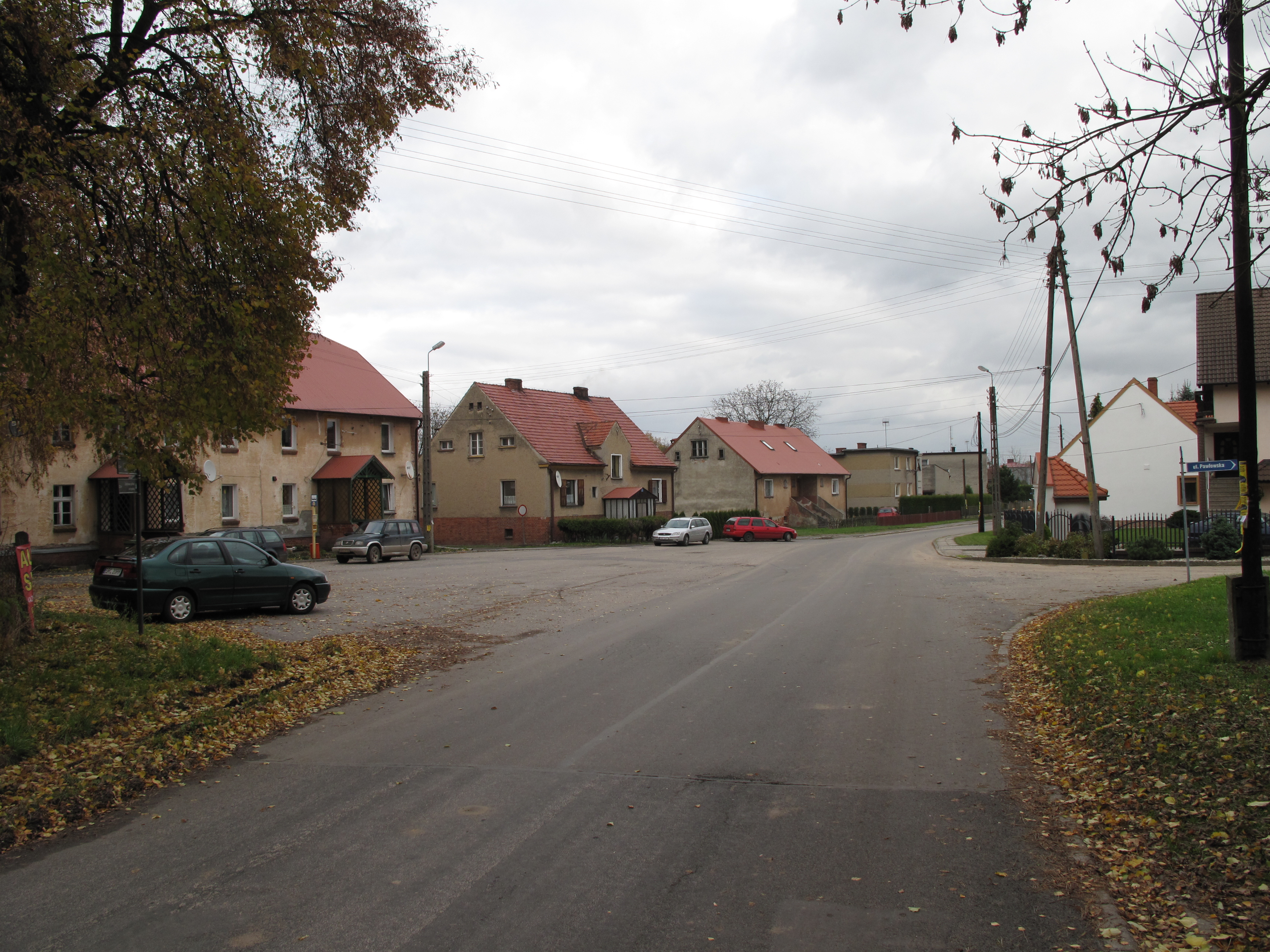
Village square
