= Topór, Mińsk County =

Topór
- Village
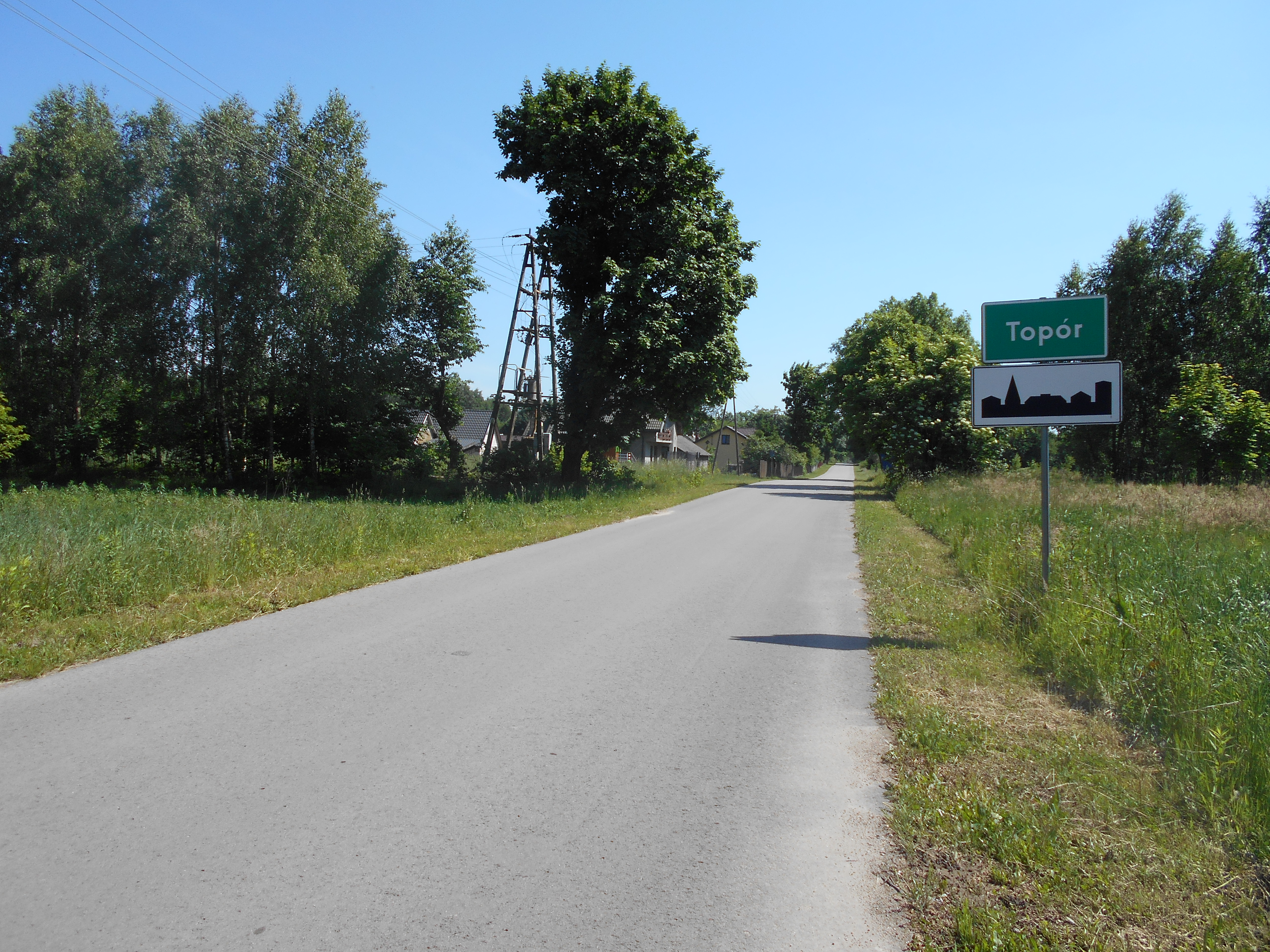

- Location within Poland
- Coordinates: 52°8′N 21°56′E
- Country: Poland
- Voivodeship: Masovian
- County: Mińsk
- Gmina: Mrozy

Population
  - Total: 118
- Time zone: UTC+1 (CET)
  - Summer (DST): UTC+2 (CEST)

Topór [ˈtɔpur] is a village in the administrative district of Gmina Mrozy, within Mińsk County, Masovian Voivodeship, in east-central Poland.

Five Polish citizens were murdered by Nazi Germany in the village during World War II.
