= Klapka, Poland =

Klapka
- Village
- Location within Poland
- Coordinates: 51°15′37″N 18°28′54″E
- Country: Poland
- Voivodeship: Łódź
- County: Wieluń
- Gmina: Biała

Klapka [ˈklapka] is a village in the administrative district of Gmina Biała, within Wieluń County, Łódź Voivodeship, in central Poland.
