= Stara Wieś =

Stara Wieś (literally old village in Polish) may refer to the following places in Poland:

- Stara Wieś, Silesian Voivodeship (south Poland)
- Stara Wieś, Podkarpackie Voivodeship (south-east Poland)
- Stara Wieś, Subcarpathian Voivodeship (south-east Poland)
- Stara Wieś, Aleksandrów County in Kuyavian-Pomeranian Voivodeship (north-central Poland)
- Stara Wieś, Inowrocław County in Kuyavian-Pomeranian Voivodeship (north-central Poland)
- Stara Wieś, Biłgoraj County in Lublin Voivodeship (east Poland)
- Stara Wieś, Chełm County in Lublin Voivodeship (east Poland)
- Stara Wieś, Hrubieszów County in Lublin Voivodeship (east Poland)
- Stara Wieś, Krasnystaw County in Lublin Voivodeship (east Poland)
- Stara Wieś, Gmina Krośniewice in Łódź Voivodeship (central Poland)
- Stara Wieś, Gmina Kutno in Łódź Voivodeship (central Poland)
- Stara Wieś, Piotrków County in Łódź Voivodeship (central Poland)
- Stara Wieś, Radomsko County in Łódź Voivodeship (central Poland)
- Stara Wieś, Rawa County in Łódź Voivodeship (central Poland)
- Stara Wieś, Sieradz County in Łódź Voivodeship (central Poland)
- Stara Wieś, Gmina Łęczna in Lublin Voivodeship (east Poland)
- Stara Wieś, Gmina Puchaczów in Lublin Voivodeship (east Poland)
- Stara Wieś, Puławy County in Lublin Voivodeship (east Poland)
- Stara Wieś, Radzyń County in Lublin Voivodeship (east Poland)
- Stara Wieś, Limanowa County in Lesser Poland Voivodeship (south Poland)
- Stara Wieś, Miechów County in Lesser Poland Voivodeship (south Poland)
- Stara Wieś, Nowy Sącz County in Lesser Poland Voivodeship (south Poland)
- Stara Wieś, Białobrzegi County in Masovian Voivodeship (east-central Poland)
- Stara Wieś, Grójec County in Masovian Voivodeship (east-central Poland)
- Stara Wieś, Lipsko County in Masovian Voivodeship (east-central Poland)
- Stara Wieś, Mińsk County in Masovian Voivodeship (east-central Poland)
- Stara Wieś, Otwock County in Masovian Voivodeship (east-central Poland)
- Stara Wieś, Piaseczno County in Masovian Voivodeship (east-central Poland)
- Stara Wieś, Pruszków County in Masovian Voivodeship (east-central Poland)
- Stara Wieś, Przasnysz County in Masovian Voivodeship (east-central Poland)
- Stara Wieś, Siedlce County in Masovian Voivodeship (east-central Poland)
- Stara Wieś, Żyrardów County in Masovian Voivodeship (east-central Poland)
- Stara Wieś, Lubusz Voivodeship (west Poland)
- Stara Wieś, Pomeranian Voivodeship (north Poland)
- Stara Wieś, Pszczyna in Silesian Voivodeship (south Poland)
- Stara Wieś, Opole Voivodeship (southwest Poland)
