= 3rd Silesian Uhlan Regiment =

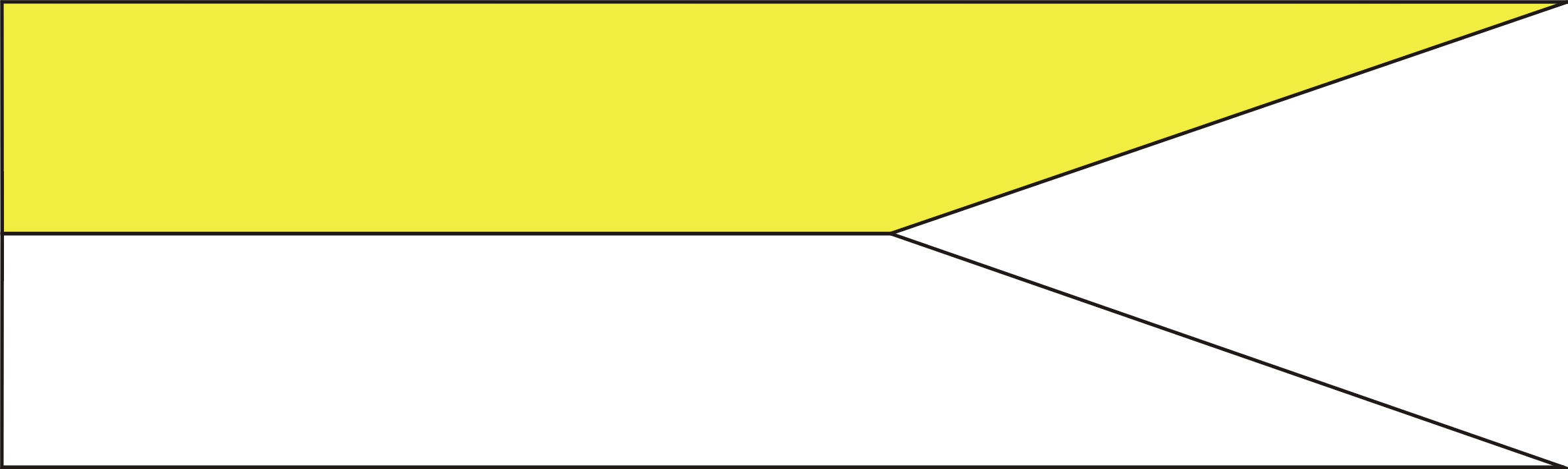
- Regimental Pennant
- Active: 1917-1947
- Disbanded: 14 June 1947
- Country: Poland
- Branch: Polish Land Forces
- Type: Cavalry regiment; Armoured regiment
- Role: Uhlans
- Part of: Polish Armed Forces in the West
- Nickname(s): Third Children of Warsaw

Commanders
- First Commandant: Zygmunt Łempicki
- Last Commandant: Jerzy Anders

The 3rd Silesian Uhlan Regiment (Polish: 3 Pułk Ułanów Śląskich, 3 puł) was a cavalry regiment of the Polish Land Forces in the Second Polish Republic and later an armoured regiment of the Polish Armed Forces in the West. Its traditions dated back to the uhlans of the Duchy of Warsaw.

== History ==
=== Polish I Corps (1917–1918) ===
The Third Uhlan Regiment was formed in November 1917, as part of the Polish I Corps in Russia. It existed only until July 1918, and consisted of elements of several other ethnic Polish units.

=== Third Army (1918–1921) ===
On 13 October 1918, in Warsaw, Colonel Stefan Strzemieński began forming a new Uhlan regiment. Its squadrons were located both in Warsaw and Zagłębie Dąbrowskie, taking part in disarming demoralized German soldiers of the Ober Ost. In January 1919, two squadrons were sent to the eastern region of former Austrian Galicia, to fight in the Polish–Ukrainian War. In April 1919, the whole regiment fought in Polesie and around Minsk, remaining in Belarus until May 1920.

As part of Edward Rydz-Śmigły's Third Army, the regiment fought in the 1920 Kiev offensive. It protected the Polish rear during the retreat of early summer 1920 and then fought against the Soviets in the bloody Battle of Cycow. In this battle, together with 7th Lublin Uhlan Regiment, it formed the 4th Cavalry Brigade. After the battle, the regiment chased the enemy towards Białystok and Augustów, where it clashed with Lithuanian troops, advancing southwards. It then fought in the Battle of the Niemen River, remaining along Polish–Soviet demarcation line until mid-1921.

=== Third Children of Warsaw (1921-1938) ===
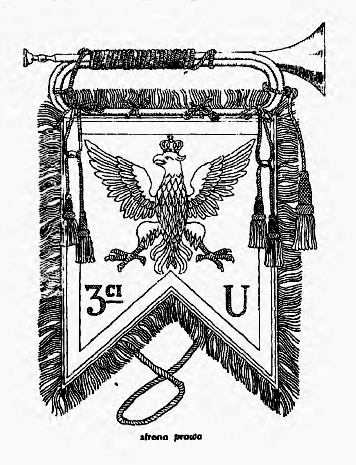
Historical banner of the 3rd Regiment

On 16 October 1921, a flag was presented to the regiment, and it was named Third Children of Warsaw Uhlan Regiment by the City Council of Warsaw. This name was not officially accepted by the Ministry of Military Affairs.

In June 1922, the regiment was sent to the Polish part of Upper Silesia, to take over the part of the region that was awarded to the Second Polish Republic after the Upper Silesia plebiscite. In the same year, it was garrisoned in the town of Tarnowskie Góry, where it remained until the 1939 Invasion of Poland. In 1924, its reserve squadron was placed in Bochnia, and in 1926, the third squadron was garrisoned in Pszczyna. From 1937–1939, the regiment was a part of the Kraków Cavalry Brigade. The adjective "Silesian" was added to its official name in 1938, following a motion of the Silesian Sejm.

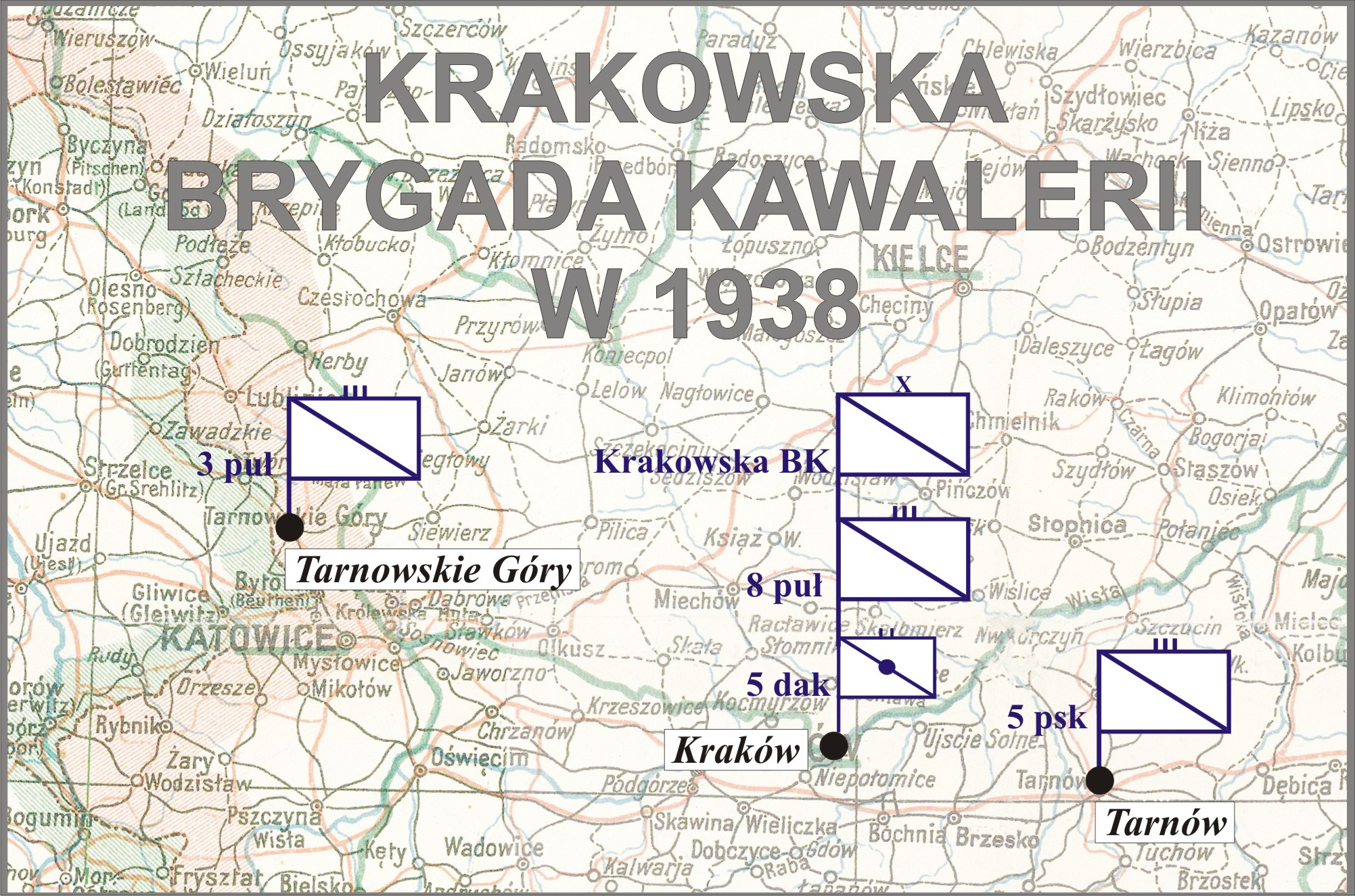
Krakowska BK w 1938

=== Invasion of Poland (1939) ===
On 1 September 1939, the regiment, reinforced with the National Defense Tarnowskie Góry Battalion, was positioned north of Tarnowskie Góry, along the Kalety – Koszecin line. Its third squadron was sent to Boza Gora, where it was engaged in heavy fighting against the advancing Wehrmacht.

Until September 3, the regiment fought German 2nd Light Division. It then began to retreat east, together with the whole Army Kraków. On September 6, the regiment took defensive positions near Pińczów, to cross the Vistula two days later. On September 8–12, it fought near Tarnobrzeg, and then retreated further east, to the area of Tarnogród. On September 19, the regiment was destroyed, and on the next day, its remnants capitulated, together with the whole Kraków Cavalry Brigade.

=== Home Army (1944-1945) ===
In mid-1944, the regiment was recreated by the Home Army (AK). As part of AK's 106th Infantry Division, it operated in the area of Częstochowa and Miechów, to be dissolved on 19 January 1945.

=== Armed Forces in the West (1945-1947) ===
On 21 August 1944, yet another Third Silesian Uhlans Regiment was formed in San Basilio, Italy, as part of Polish Armed Forces in the West. As an armoured unit, it belonged to the 14th Greater Poland Armoured Brigade. The regiment was dissolved in Great Britain, on 14 June 1947.

== Commandants ==
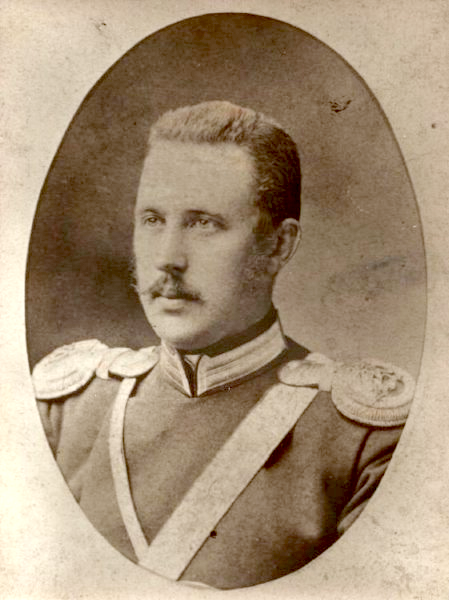
Colonel Zygmunt Łempicki, first commandant of the regiment, wearing the Imperial Russian Army uniform

Commandants
Rank	Name	Service		Notes
Rank	Name	Start	End	Notes
Colonel	Zygmunt Lempicki	14 November 1917	12 February 1918	
Colonel	Stefan Strzemieński	12 February 1918	16 July 1920	
Major	Cyprian Bystram	17 July 1920	1928	
Colonel	Kazimierz Zelislawski	January 1928	March 1937	
Colonel	Czeslaw Chmielewski	March 1937	September 1939	
Major	K. Skierczynski	1943	1945	Home Army (Polish Resistance)
Colonel	Eugeniusz Swiecicki	1944	1945	
Colonel	Jerzy Anders	1945	1947	

== Symbols of the Regiment ==
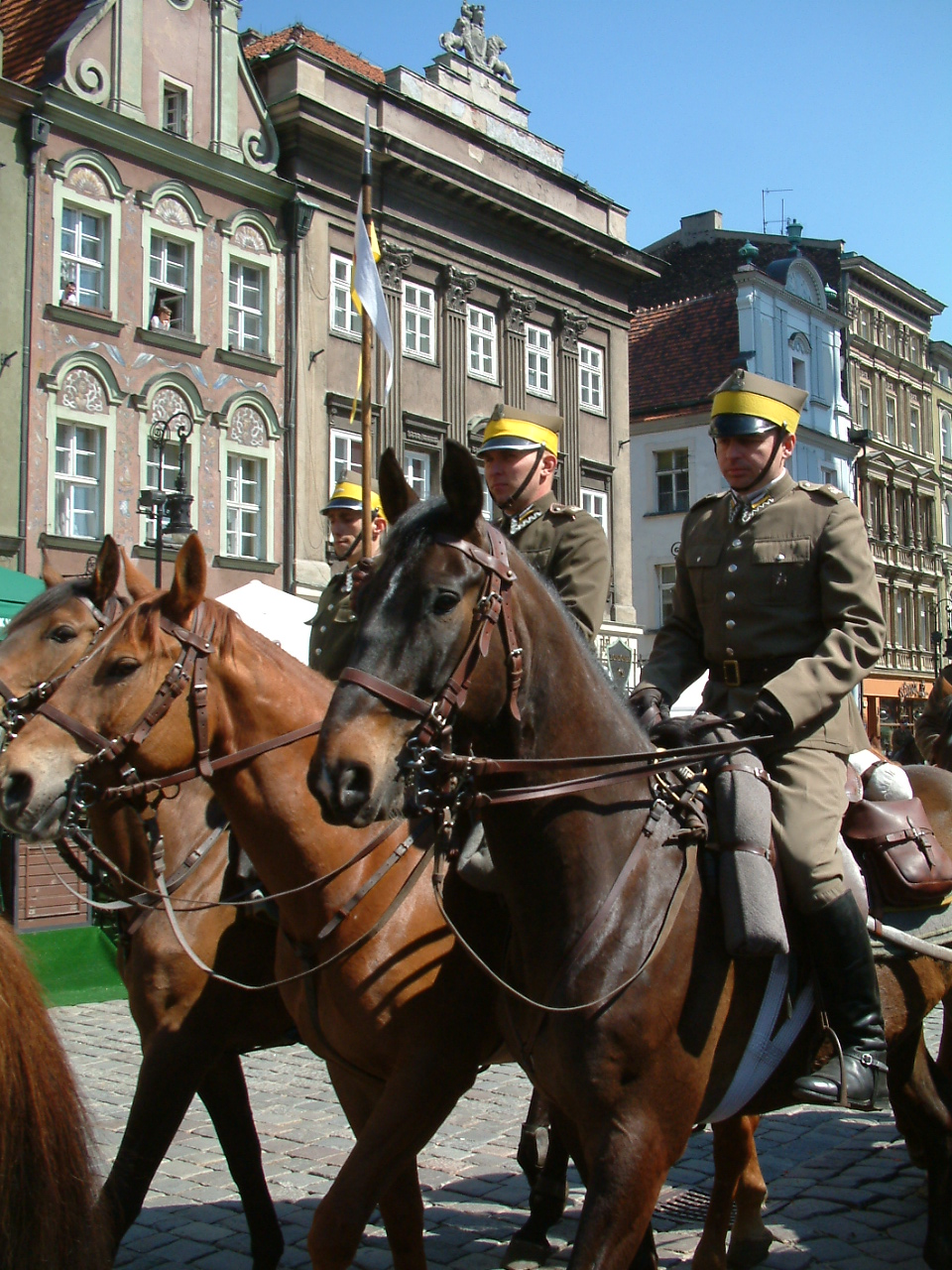
Reenactors wearing the uniform of Silesian Uhlans

The regiment had two flags. The first flag was funded by the Polish diaspora in the USA and is now kept at the Polish Army Museum in Warsaw. The second one, funded by the residents of Warsaw and presented to the regiment by Józef Piłsudski on 16 October 1921, was lost in the 1939 campaign.

On 30 January 1923, General Kazimierz Sosnkowski accepted the regimental badge. A rectangle–shaped (33 by 30 millimeters), with an oak leaf, and the inscription U 3. In the corners of the rectangle were symbolic dates, referring to the history of the regiment: 1807, 1831, 1917 and 1918. The badge was designed by the then-commandant of the regiment, Major Cyprian Bystram, and it was manufactured by Warsaw artisans Mojzesz Nelken and Rubin Krajkemann.

Originally, the regiment celebrated its day on October 16 (the anniversary of the presentation of the new flag). In 1927, the day was changed to September 23, the anniversary of the 1920 capture of the Niemen river bridge near Druskienniki. Finally, in 1937, the day of the 3rd Regiment was established on June 14, the anniversary of the 1919 capture of the town of Lohiszyn (in modern–day Belarus).

The Third Silesian Uhlans Regiment also had its own zurawiejka: "Charging the funeral is the Third Regiment of Uhlans, Each mother sleeps peacefully when her son serves in Bystram's unit, an ass in the saddle, a forehead in the clouds, this is the Tarnowskie Góry regiment."

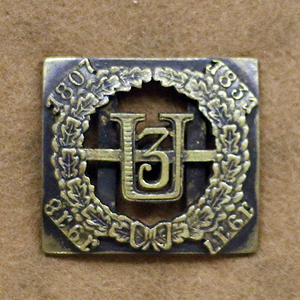
Unit badge

In April 2007, Public Middle School nr. 4 in Tarnowskie Góry was named after Third Silesian Uhlans Regiment.

== See also ==
- Polish cavalry

== Sources ==
- Jan Przemsza-Zieliński, Księga wrześniowej chwały pułków śląskich, tom I, Krajowa Agencja Wydawnicza, Katowice 1989, ISBN 83-03-02883-9.
- Henryk Smaczny, Księga Kawalerii Polskiej 1914–1947. Rodowody – Barwa – Broń, wyd. TESCO, Warszawa 1989, ISBN 83-00-02555-3.
- Cezary Leżeński, Zostały tylko ślady podków, Książka i Wiedza, Warszawa 1984, ISBN 83-05-11122-9.
- Kazimierz Satora, Opowieści wrześniowych sztandarów, Instytut Wydawniczy PAX, Warszawa 1990
