= Ludwinów =

Ludwinów may refer to the following places in Poland:

- Ludwinów, part of the Dębniki district of Kraków
- Ludwinów, Greater Poland Voivodeship (west-central Poland)
- Ludwinów, Gmina Leśna Podlaska, Biała County in Lublin Voivodeship (east Poland)
- Ludwinów, Łęczna County in Lublin Voivodeship (east Poland)
- Ludwinów, Puławy County in Lublin Voivodeship (east Poland)
- Ludwinów, Gmina Dorohusk in Lublin Voivodeship (east Poland)
- Ludwinów, Gmina Borzechów in Lublin Voivodeship (east Poland)
- Ludwinów, Gmina Niemce in Lublin Voivodeship (east Poland)
- Ludwinów, Opoczno County in Łódź Voivodeship (central Poland)
- Ludwinów, Wieruszów County in Łódź Voivodeship (central Poland)
- Ludwinów, Mińsk County in Masovian Voivodeship (east-central Poland)
- Ludwinów, Radom County in Masovian Voivodeship (east-central Poland)
- Ludwinów, Węgrów County in Masovian Voivodeship (east-central Poland)
- Ludwinów, Wołomin County in Masovian Voivodeship (east-central Poland)
- Ludwinów, Częstochowa County in Silesian Voivodeship (south Poland)
- Ludwinów, Myszków County in Silesian Voivodeship (south Poland)
- Ludwinów, Busko County in Świętokrzyskie Voivodeship (south-central Poland)
- Ludwinów, Włoszczowa County in Świętokrzyskie Voivodeship (south-central Poland)
- Ludwinów, Gmina Jędrzejów in Świętokrzyskie Voivodeship (south-central Poland)
- Ludwinów, Gmina Małogoszcz in Świętokrzyskie Voivodeship (south-central Poland)
- Ludwinów, Gmina Wodzisław in Świętokrzyskie Voivodeship (south-central Poland)
