= Świerszczów =

Świerszczów may refer to:

- Świerszczów, Hrubieszów County, Poland
- Świerszczów, Łęczna County, Poland
- Świerszczów-Kolonia, Poland

== See also ==
- Świerszczewo (disambiguation)
- Świerczów (disambiguation)
