= Kopina =

Kopina may refer to the following places in Poland:

- Kopina, Łęczna County in Lublin Voivodeship (east Poland)
- Kopina, Łuków County in Lublin Voivodeship (east Poland)
- Kopina, Parczew County in Lublin Voivodeship (east Poland)
- Kopina, Warmian-Masurian Voivodeship (north-east Poland)
