= Augustów (disambiguation) =

Augustów may refer to:

- Augustów in Podlaskie Voivodeship (north-east Poland)
- Augustów, Gmina Kowala in Masovian Voivodeship (east-central Poland)
- Augustów, Gmina Pionki in Masovian Voivodeship (east-central Poland)
- Augustów, Kozienice County in Masovian Voivodeship (east-central Poland)
- Augustów, Lower Silesian Voivodeship (south-west Poland)
- Augustów, Opoczno County in Łódź Voivodeship (central Poland)
- Augustów, Pajęczno County in Łódź Voivodeship (central Poland)
- Augustów, Przasnysz County in Masovian Voivodeship (east-central Poland)
- Augustów roundup, a Soviet military operation against partisans and sympathizers after the takeover of Poland
