= Garbatówka =

- Village
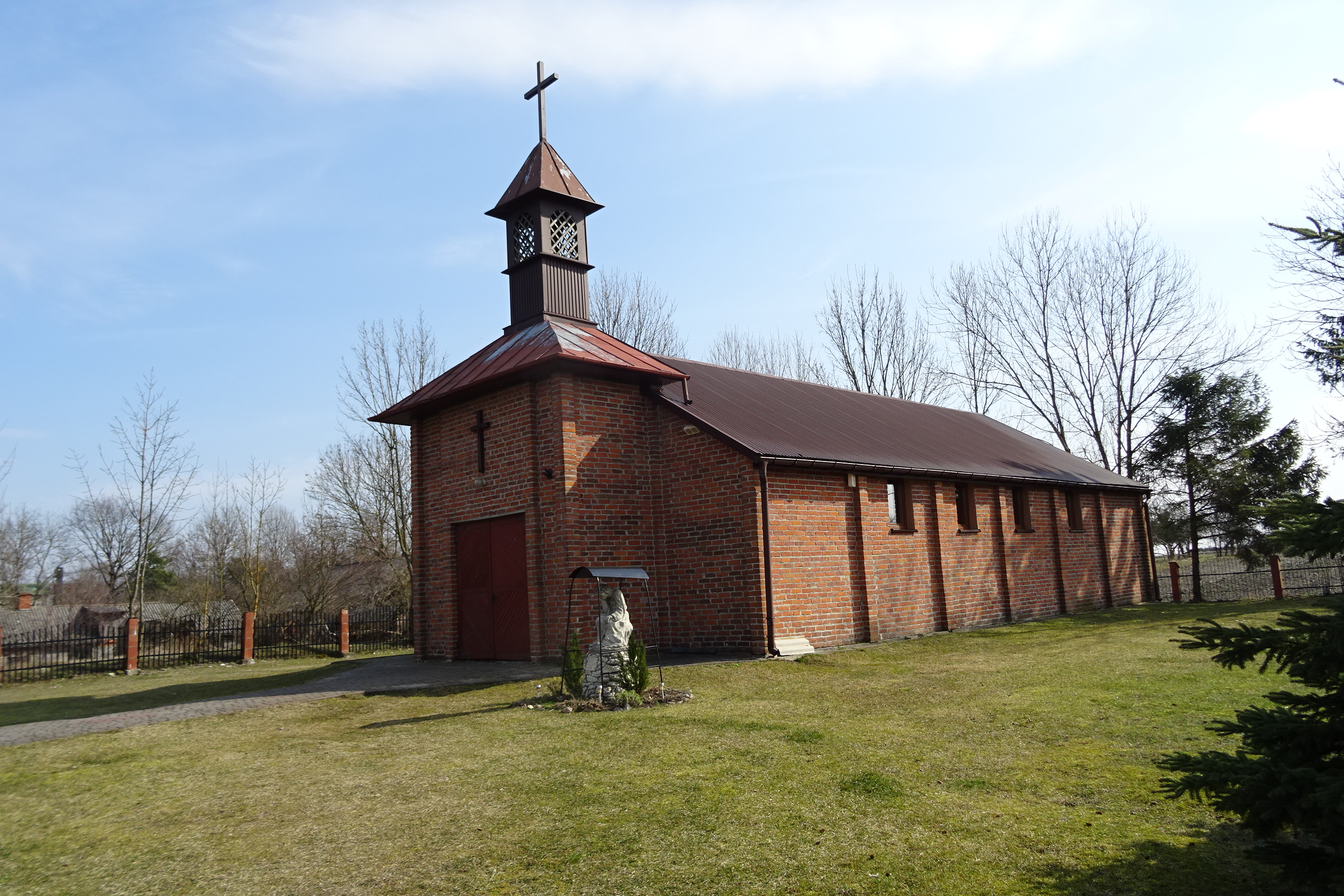
- Catholic chapel in Garbatówka

- Location within Poland
- Coordinates: 51°22′N 23°7′E
- Country: Poland
- Voivodeship: Lublin
- County: Łęczna
- Gmina: Cyców
- Time zone: UTC+1 (CET)
  - Summer (DST): UTC+2 (CEST)

Garbatówka [ɡarbaˈtufka] is a village in the administrative district of Gmina Cyców, within Łęczna County, Lublin Voivodeship, in eastern Poland.

== History ==
Six Polish citizens were murdered by Nazi Germany in the village during World War II.
