= Malinówka, Łęczna County =

Malinówka
- Village
- Location within Poland
- Coordinates: 51°16′32″N 23°4′22″E
- Country: Poland
- Voivodeship: Lublin
- County: Łęczna
- Gmina: Cyców

Malinówka [maliˈnufka] is a village in the administrative district of Gmina Cyców, within Łęczna County, Lublin Voivodeship, in eastern Poland.
