= Karolin, Łęczna County =

Karolin
- Village
- Location within Poland
- Coordinates: 51°19′52.68″N 22°50′0.06″E
- Country: Poland
- Voivodeship: Lublin
- County: Łęczna
- Gmina: Łęczna

Karolin [kaˈrɔlin] is a village in the administrative district of Gmina Łęczna, within Łęczna County, Lublin Voivodeship, in eastern Poland.
