= Adamów, Łęczna County =

Adamów
- Village
- Location within Poland
- Coordinates: 51°16′N 23°6′E
- Country: Poland
- Voivodeship: Lublin
- County: Łęczna
- Gmina: Cyców

Adamów [aˈdamuf] is a village in the administrative district of Gmina Cyców, within Łęczna County, Lublin Voivodeship, in eastern Poland.
