= Stanisław Grzesiuk =

Polish singer and writer

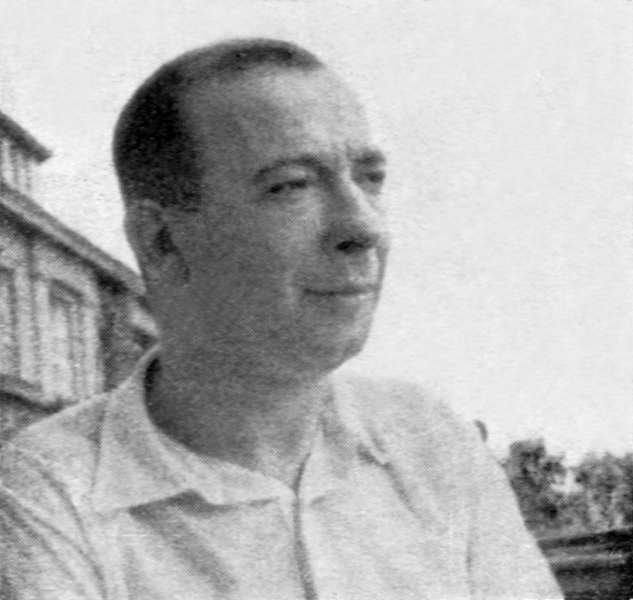
- Born: May 6, 1918; Małków, Kingdom of Poland
- Died: January 21, 1963 (aged 44); Warsaw, Polish People's Republic
- Resting place: Powązki Military Cemetery
- Occupations: Electromechanic; Radio broadcaster; Writer
- Spouses: Anna Antoszkiewicz; Czesława Żórawska
- Children: 4
- Writing career
- Pen name: Bard of Czerniaków (Bard z Czerniakowa)
- Language: Warsaw dialect
- Years active: 1958–1963
- Genres: Autobiography; Street ballads
- Subject: Working class life in Warsaw
- Notable works: Boso, ale w ostrogach, Na marginesie życia

Stanisław Grzesiuk (Polish pronunciation: [staˈɲiswaf ˈɡʐɛɕuk]; 6 May 1918 – 21 January 1963) was a Polish writer, poet, singer, and comedian. He is notable as one of the few public figures to use and promote the singing style and dialect of pre-war Warsaw after their near extinction in the aftermath of the 1944 Warsaw Uprising.

== Life ==
Grzesiuk was born on 6 May 1918 in Małków, Kingdom of Poland. Early in his life his family moved to Warsaw's borough of Czerniaków, a distinct cultural area populated mostly by factory workers and other working poor. After graduating from a local trade school he started work as an electro-technician for various enterprises.

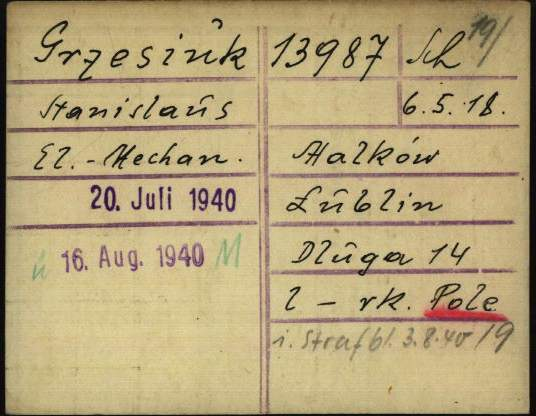
Registration card of Stanisław Grzesiuk as a prisoner at Dachau Nazi Concentration Camp

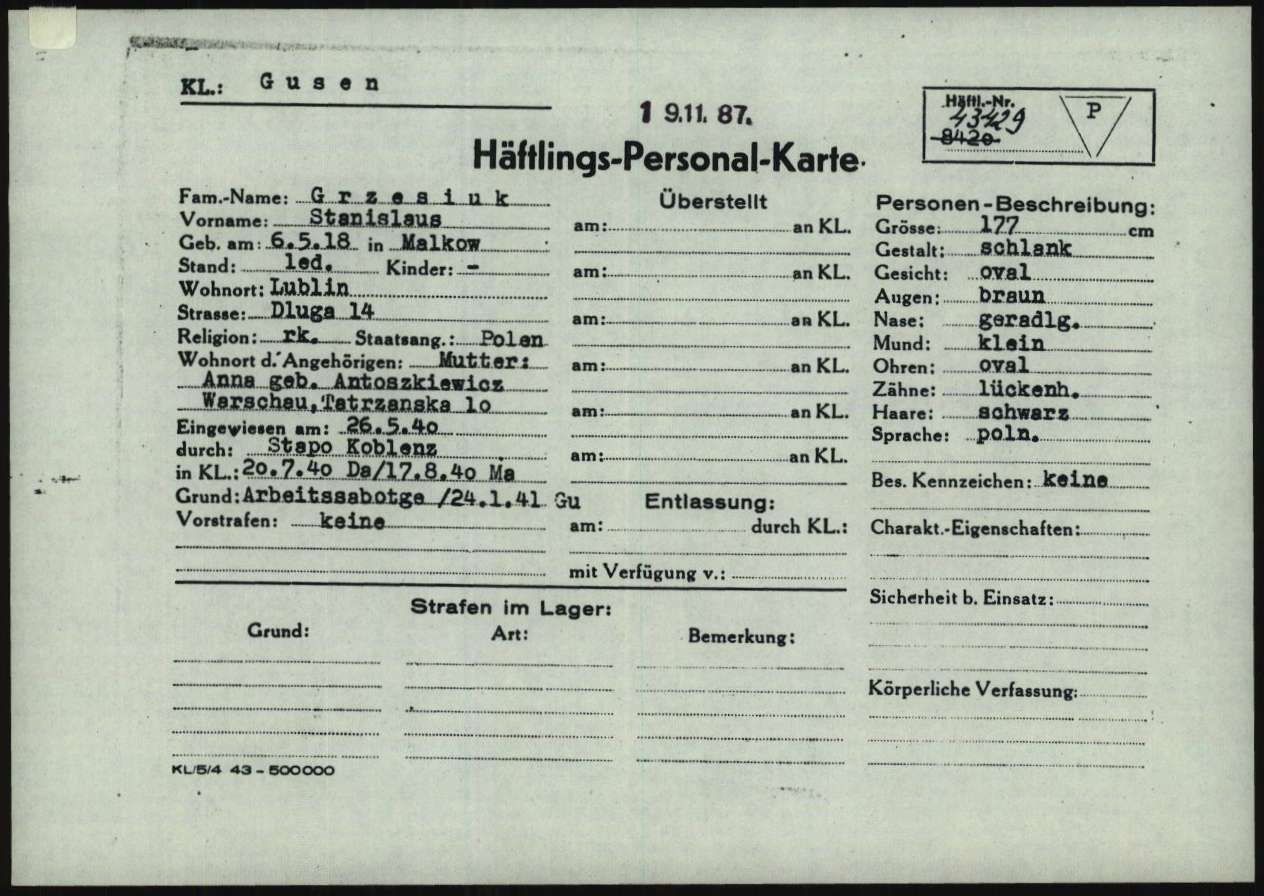
Registration card at Mauthausen/Gusen

After the outbreak of World War II he was arrested by the Germans in 1940 and sent to Germany as a slave worker. However, on 4 April of that year he was sent to Dachau concentration camp following an attempted escape. He was later transferred to Gusen I (Mauthausen) and would spend almost five years there until the camp's liberation by the American army.

Liberated on 5 May 1945, he returned to Poland. Although he survived the Holocaust, his health never recovered and Grzesiuk suffered from serious tuberculosis, which eventually killed him.

After the war, Grzesiuk started documenting his pre-war and wartime experiences. In 1958 he debuted with Pięć lat kacetu (transl. Five Years in Concentration Camps), a description of his stay in Nazi Germany during the war. The following year he published Boso, ale w ostrogach (transl. Barefoot but with spurs), a description of the pre-war life of Czerniaków, one of the most colorful boroughs of Warsaw. After its publication he became known as the chronicler of life of pre-war Warsaw in numerous songs, including the street ballads for which he became best known. Grzesiuk gained wide popularity as a singer during this period and played a prominent role in various Warsaw traditional-song groups, as a songwriter, singer and mandolin-banjo player.

In the 1960s he started his work on yet another novel, Na marginesie życia (transl. On the Margin of Life), documenting his struggle against tuberculosis, as well as the Polish post-war welfare services. In 1960 he joined Polish Writers' Union. Grzesiuk died on 21 January 1963 in Warsaw. His last book was published posthumously the following year.

== Sources ==
- Stanisław Grzesiuk: Boso, ale w ostrogach, Na marginesie życia, Pięć lat kacetu
