= Stara Wieś-Stasin =

- Village
- Location within Poland
- Coordinates: 51°19′1″N 22°55′21″E
- Country: Poland
- Voivodeship: Lublin
- County: Łęczna
- Gmina: Łęczna
- Population: 160

Stara Wieś-Stasin [ˈstara ˈvjɛɕ ˈstaɕin] is a village in the administrative district of Gmina Łęczna, within Łęczna County, Lublin Voivodeship, in eastern Poland.

It has a population of about 3,100.
