= Piotrówek Drugi =

- Village
- Location within Poland
- Coordinates: 51°16′50″N 22°49′14″E
- Country: Poland
- Voivodeship: Lublin
- County: Łęczna
- Gmina: Łęczna

Piotrówek Drugi [pjɔˈtruvɛk ˈdruɡi] is a village in the administrative district of Gmina Łęczna, within Łęczna County, Lublin Voivodeship, in eastern Poland. The town is well known for its specialty Blinis, as well as the 20 km (12 mi) road that leads up to it.
