= Podzamcze =

Podzamcze may refer to the following places:

- Podzamcze, Kuyavian-Pomeranian Voivodeship (north-central Poland)
- Podzamcze, Lublin County in Lublin Voivodeship (east Poland)
- Podzamcze, Łęczna County in Lublin Voivodeship (east Poland)
- Podzamcze, Świdnik County in Lublin Voivodeship (east Poland)
- Podzamcze, Busko County in Świętokrzyskie Voivodeship (south-central Poland)
- Podzamcze, Kielce County in Świętokrzyskie Voivodeship (south-central Poland)
- Podzamcze, Masovian Voivodeship (east-central Poland)
- Podzamcze, Silesian Voivodeship (south Poland)
- Podzamcze, Lubusz Voivodeship (west Poland)
- Podzamcze, Pomeranian Voivodeship (north Poland)
- Podzamcze (Wałbrzych), city district of Wałbrzych in Lower Silesia
