= Stefanów =

Stefanów may refer to the following places:

- Stefanów, Bełchatów County in Łódź Voivodeship (central Poland)
- Stefanów, Brzeziny County in Łódź Voivodeship (central Poland)
- Stefanów, Chełm County in Lublin Voivodeship (east Poland)
- Stefanów, Garwolin County in Masovian Voivodeship (east-central Poland)
- Stefanów, Gmina Brójce in Łódź Voivodeship (central Poland)
- Stefanów, Gmina Koluszki in Łódź Voivodeship (central Poland)
- Stefanów, Gmina Rokiciny, Tomaszów County in Łódź Voivodeship (central Poland)
- Stefanów, Gostynin County in Masovian Voivodeship (central Poland)
- Stefanów, Jarocin County in Greater Poland Voivodeship (west-central Poland)
- Stefanów, Kutno County in Łódź Voivodeship (central Poland)
- Stefanów, Łęczna County in Lublin Voivodeship (east Poland)
- Stefanów, Lower Silesian Voivodeship (south-west Poland)
- Stefanów, Opoczno County in Łódź Voivodeship (central Poland)
- Stefanów, Radom County in Masovian Voivodeship (east-central Poland)
- Stefanów, Silesian Voivodeship (south Poland)
- Stefanów, Turek County in Greater Poland Voivodeship (central Poland)
- Stefanów, Zgierz County in Łódź Voivodeship (central Poland)
- Stefanów, Zwoleń County in Masovian Voivodeship (east-central Poland)
