= Stawek-Kolonia =

- Village
- Location within Poland
- Coordinates: 51°16′41″N 23°10′26″E
- Country: Poland
- Voivodeship: Lublin
- County: Łęczna
- Gmina: Cyców

Stawek-Kolonia [ˈstavɛk kɔˈlɔɲa] is a village in the administrative district of Gmina Cyców, within Łęczna County, Lublin Voivodeship, in eastern Poland.
