= Cyców-Kolonia Druga =

- Village
- Location within Poland
- Coordinates: 51°17′33″N 23°09′37″E
- Country: Poland
- Voivodeship: Lublin
- County: Łęczna
- Gmina: Cyców

Cyców-Kolonia Druga [ˈt͡sɨt͡suf kɔˈlɔɲa ˈdruɡa] is a village in the administrative district of Gmina Cyców, within Łęczna County, Lublin Voivodeship, in eastern Poland.
