= Zosin, Łęczna County =

Zosin
- Village
- Location within Poland
- Coordinates: 51°14′34″N 23°08′30″E
- Country: Poland
- Voivodeship: Lublin
- County: Łęczna
- Gmina: Cyców

Zosin [ˈzɔɕin] is a village in the administrative district of Gmina Cyców, within Łęczna County, Lublin Voivodeship, in eastern Poland.
