= Rossosz, Łęczna County =

Rossosz
- Village
- Location within Poland
- Coordinates: 51°17′25″N 22°51′37″E
- Country: Poland
- Voivodeship: Lublin
- County: Łęczna
- Gmina: Łęczna

Rossosz [ˈrɔssɔʂ] is a village in the administrative district of Gmina Łęczna, within Łęczna County, Lublin Voivodeship, in eastern Poland.
