= Stara Wieś-Kolonia =

- Village
- Location within Poland
- Coordinates: 51°19′46″N 22°54′08″E
- Country: Poland
- Voivodeship: Lublin
- County: Łęczna
- Gmina: Łęczna

Stara Wieś-Kolonia [ˈstara ˈvjɛɕ kɔˈlɔɲa] is a village in the administrative district of Gmina Łęczna, within Łęczna County, Lublin Voivodeship, in eastern Poland.
