= Zakrzów, Łęczna County =

Zakrzów
- Village
- Location within Poland
- Coordinates: 51°16′24″N 22°52′04″E
- Country: Poland
- Voivodeship: Lublin
- County: Łęczna
- Gmina: Łęczna

Zakrzów [ˈzakʂuf] is a village in the administrative district of Gmina Łęczna, within Łęczna County, Lublin Voivodeship, in eastern Poland.
