= Garbatówka-Kolonia =

- Village
- Location within Poland
- Coordinates: 51°20′45″N 23°06′24″E
- Country: Poland
- Voivodeship: Lublin
- County: Łęczna
- Gmina: Cyców

Garbatówka-Kolonia [ɡarbaˈtufka kɔˈlɔɲa] is a village in the administrative district of Gmina Cyców, within Łęczna County, Lublin Voivodeship, in eastern Poland.
