= Wólka Cycowska =

- Village
- Location within Poland
- Coordinates: 51°19′N 23°7′E
- Country: Poland
- Voivodeship: Lublin
- County: Łęczna
- Gmina: Cyców

Wólka Cycowska [ˈvulka t͡sɨˈt͡sɔfska] is a village in the administrative district of Gmina Cyców, within Łęczna County, Lublin Voivodeship, in eastern Poland.
