= Janowica, Łęczna County =

Janowica
- Village
- Location within Poland
- Coordinates: 51°20′N 23°5′E
- Country: Poland
- Voivodeship: Lublin
- County: Łęczna
- Gmina: Cyców
- Website: http://www.figiel.prv.pl

Janowica [janɔˈvit͡sa] is a village in the administrative district of Gmina Cyców, within Łęczna County, Lublin Voivodeship, in eastern Poland.
