= Trębaczów, Lublin Voivodeship =

Trębaczów
- Village
- Location within Poland
- Coordinates: 51°17′36″N 22°49′4″E
- Country: Poland
- Voivodeship: Lublin
- County: Łęczna
- Gmina: Łęczna

Trębaczów [trɛmˈbat͡ʂuf] is a village in the administrative district of Gmina Łęczna, within Łęczna County, Lublin Voivodeship, in eastern Poland.
