= Nowy Stręczyn =

- Village
- Location within Poland
- Coordinates: 51°15′50″N 23°08′38″E
- Country: Poland
- Voivodeship: Lublin
- County: Łęczna
- Gmina: Cyców

Nowy Stręczyn [ˈnɔvɨ ˈstrɛnt͡ʂɨn] is a village in the administrative district of Gmina Cyców, within Łęczna County, Lublin Voivodeship, in eastern Poland.
