= Bekiesza (village) =

- Village
- Location within Poland
- Coordinates: 51°18′N 23°13′E
- Country: Poland
- Voivodeship: Lublin
- County: Łęczna
- Gmina: Cyców

Bekiesza [bɛˈkʲɛʂa] is a village in the administrative district of Gmina Cyców, within Łęczna County, Lublin Voivodeship, in eastern Poland.
