= Leopoldów, Łęczna County =

Leopoldów
- Village
- Location within Poland
- Coordinates: 51°15′58″N 22°52′21″E
- Country: Poland
- Voivodeship: Lublin
- County: Łęczna
- Gmina: Łęczna

Leopoldów [lɛɔˈpɔlduf] is a village in the administrative district of Gmina Łęczna, within Łęczna County, Lublin Voivodeship, in eastern Poland.
