= Zofiówka, Lublin Voivodeship =

Zofiówka
- Village
- Location within Poland
- Coordinates: 51°18′N 22°49′E
- Country: Poland
- Voivodeship: Lublin
- County: Łęczna
- Gmina: Łęczna

Zofiówka [zɔˈfjufka] is a village in the administrative district of Gmina Łęczna, within Łęczna County, Lublin Voivodeship, in eastern Poland.
