= Szczupak, Lublin Voivodeship =

Szczupak
- Village
- Location within Poland
- Coordinates: 51°21′N 23°8′E
- Country: Poland
- Voivodeship: Lublin
- County: Łęczna
- Gmina: Cyców

Szczupak [ˈʂt͡ʂupak] is a village in the administrative district of Gmina Cyców, within Łęczna County, Lublin Voivodeship, in eastern Poland.
