= Ostrówek Podyski =

- Village
- Location within Poland
- Coordinates: 51°21′05″N 23°08′04″E
- Country: Poland
- Voivodeship: Lublin
- County: Łęczna
- Gmina: Cyców

Ostrówek Podyski [ɔsˈtruvɛk pɔˈdɨski] is a village in the administrative district of Gmina Cyców, within Łęczna County, Lublin Voivodeship, in eastern Poland.
