= List of Polish UFC fighters =

Ultimate Fighting Championship
- Leader: FIGHTERS Total: 10

The Ultimate Fighting Championship (UFC) is a mixed martial arts (MMA) promotion, founded in 1993 by Art Davie and Rorion Gracie. The organization was purchased from its parent company SEG in 2001 by Zuffa LLC, a promotional company owned by Las Vegas casino magnates, Lorenzo and Frank Fertitta and managed by Dana White (current president of operations). Since its inception and through its current Zuffa management, the UFC has remained one of the more dominant MMA promotions in the world, playing host to a wide field of MMA fighters.

This list provides an up-to-date roster of all Polish fighters currently competing or who have previously competed under the UFC promotional banner. (Note: Unless otherwise cited, all fighters listed are retrieved from ufc.com.) (Note: All names presented are in accordance with UFC.com profiles and may include common nicknames or alternative spellings rather than birth names.) (Note: Fighters are included on this list if they were born in Poland or if they have represented Poland during their professional UFC career.) (Note: Fighters are organized by weight class and within their weight class by their debut under the UFC promotion.)

The ISO listed next to a fighter's name, as well as their birthplace and where they fight out of is determined by information displayed on UFC broadcasts. (Note: Where a Fighter is born, fighting out of, and the flag they represent is provided by the UFC during live broadcasts.)

The team a fighter trains with is based on who primarily corners them during their professional bouts in the UFC.

Each fight record has four categories: wins, losses, draws, and no-contests (NC). All fight records in this article are displayed in that order, with fights resulting in a no-contest listed in parentheses. (Note: Unless otherwise cited, all records are retrieved from sherdog.com.)

== Heavyweights (265 lb, 120 kg) ==
ISO	Name	Nickname	UFC record	Birthplace	Fighting Out Of	Team	UFC Debut	Notes
POL	Marek Bujło	Bujdzilla	0–1	Ełk, Poland	Ełk, Poland	Grappler Ełk	22/11/2025	Released from UFC November 2025
POL	Łukasz Brzeski	The Bull	1–6	Poronin, Poland	Nowy Targ, Poland	Nowotarski Klub Sportów Walki – Hoły Team	13/08/2022	
POL	Adam Wieczorek	Siwy	2–1	Chorzów, Poland	Chorzów, Poland	Spartan Chorzów	19/11/2017	
POL	Marcin Tybura	Tybur	14–11	Uniejów, Poland	Uniejów, Poland	Syndicate MMA; Ankos MMA	10/04/2016	
POL	Damian Grabowski	The Polish Pitbull	0–3	Opole, Poland	Opole, Poland	Lutadores Opole; FightSpirit Gym	06/02/2016	
POL	Daniel Omielańczuk	Polish Bear	4–5	Sokołów Podlaski, Poland	Warsaw, Poland	WCA Fight Team	21/09/2013	

== Light Heavyweights (205 lb, 93 kg) ==
ISO	Name	Nickname	UFC record	Birthplace	Fighting Out Of	Team	UFC Debut	Notes
POL	Iwo Baraniewski	Rudy	3–1	Warsaw, Poland	Warsaw, Poland	Aligatores Fight Club	06/12/2025	Ranked #5 2025 Fight of the Year
POL	Marcin Prachnio		4–7	Warsaw, Poland	Amsterdam, Netherlands	Tatsujin Dojo	24/02/2018	
POL	Jan Błachowicz		12–9–2	Cieszyn, Poland	Warsaw, Poland	WCA Fight Team	04/10/2014	Former UFC Light Heavyweight Champion.
POL	Krzysztof Soszynski	The Polish Experiment	6–3	Stalowa Wola, Poland	Winnipeg, Canada	Team Quest; Reign Training Center	13/12/2008	

== Middleweights (185 lb, 84 kg) ==
ISO	Name	Nickname	UFC record	Birthplace	Fighting Out Of	Team	UFC Debut	Notes
POL	Cezary Oleksiejczuk		1–0	Łęczna, Poland	Barki, Poland	Oleksiejczuk Team; Ankos MMA; Fighting Nerds	13/12/2025	
POL	Robert Bryczek		1–2	Bielsko-Biała, Poland	Bielsko-Biała, Poland	Veto Team Bielsko-Biała	10/02/2024	
POL	Michał Oleksiejczuk	Hussar	10–8 (1)	Łęczna, Poland	Barki, Poland	Oleksiejczuk Team; Ankos MMA; Fighting Nerds	30/12/2017	
POL	Oskar Piechota	Imadło	2–3 (1)	Gdańsk, Poland	Gdynia, Poland	Mighty Bulls Gdynia	21/10/2017	
POL	Bartosz Fabiński	The Butcher	3–3	Warsaw, Poland	Warsaw, Poland	WCA Fight Team	11/04/2015	
POL	Krzysztof Jotko		11–6	Elbląg, Poland	Orneta, Poland	Phuket Top Team; American Top Team	07/12/2013	
POL	Tomasz Drwal	Gorilla	3–3	Nowy Sącz, Poland	Kraków, Poland	Alliance MMA; Szkoła Walki Drwala	08/09/2007	First Polish UFC Fighter - competed at UFC 75

== Welterweights (170 lb, 77 kg) ==
ISO	Name	Nickname	UFC record	Birthplace	Fighting Out Of	Team	UFC Debut	Notes
POL	Salim Touahri	Grizzly	0–3	Kraków, Poland	Kraków, Poland	Grappling Kraków	21/10/2017	
POL	Paweł Pawlak	Plastinho	1–2	Łódź, Poland	Łódź, Poland	Octopus Łódź	31/05/2014	
GER	Peter Sobotta		4–6	Zabrze, Poland	Balingen, Germany	Planet Eater	13/06/2009	

== Lightweights (155 lb, 70 kg) ==
ISO	Name	Nickname	UFC record	Birthplace	Fighting Out Of	Team	UFC Debut	Notes
POL	Damian Rzepecki	The Butcher	0–1	Piotrków Trybunalski, Poland	Łódź, Poland	Top Fit Center Piotrków Trybunalski; Octopus Łódź	25/07/2026	
POL	Mateusz Rębecki	Chińczyk	5–4	Gryfice, Poland	Szczecin, Poland	Berserker's Team; American Top Team	14/01/2023	
POL	Michał Figlak	Mad Dog, Mike	0–2	Poznań, Poland	Bristol, England	Trojan Free Fighters	03/09/2022	
POL	Mateusz Gamrot	Gamer	9–5	Bielsko-Biała, Poland	Poznań, Poland	Czerwony Smok; American Top Team	18/10/2020	Fastest submission by kimura in UFC history (65 seconds)
POL	Marcin Held	The Polish Prodigy	1–3	Tychy, Poland	Tychy, Poland	Gracie Barra Bastion Tychy	05/11/2016	
POL	Łukasz Sajewski	Wookie	0–3	Gdańsk, Poland	Gdańsk, Poland	Mighty Bulls Gdynia; Złomiarz Team Gdańsk	20/06/2015	
POL	Marcin Bandel	Bomba	0–2	Pabianice, Poland	Pabianice, Poland	Zenith Vera Fight Club; Ankos MMA	04/10/2014	
POL	Piotr Hallmann	Płetwal	2–4	Gdynia, Poland	Gdynia, Poland	The MMA Lab	04/09/2013	

== Featherweights (145 lb, 65 kg) ==
ISO	Name	Nickname	UFC record	Birthplace	Fighting Out Of	Team	UFC Debut	Notes
POL	Robert Ruchała	Faker	0–2	Nowy Sącz, Poland	Nowy Sącz, Poland	Grappling Kraków; Fight House Nowy Sącz; American Top Team	06/09/2025	
POL	Marcin Wrzosek	The Polish Zombie	0–1	Bydgoszcz, Poland	Bytom, Poland	Shark Top Team Bytom	11/12/2015	
POL	Bart Palaszewski	Bartimus	1–3	Warsaw, Poland	Wonder Lake, Illinois, U.S.	Team Curran	10/29/2011	

== Bantamweights (135 lb, 61 kg) ==
ISO	Name	Nickname	UFC record	Birthplace	Fighting Out Of	Team	UFC Debut	Notes
POL	Jakub Wikłacz	Masa	2–0	Olsztyn, Poland	Poznań, Poland	Czerwony Smok	04/10/2025	
POL	Damian Stasiak	Webster	2–4	Zgierz, Poland	Łódź, Poland	United Gym	11/04/2015	

== Women's bantamweights (135 lb, 61 kg) ==
ISO	Name	Nickname	UFC record	Birthplace	Fighting Out Of	Team	UFC Debut	Notes
POL	Klaudia Syguła		2–2	Poddębice, Poland	Poznań, Poland	Ankos MMA; American Top Team	09/11/2024	

== Women's strawweights (115 lb, 52 kg) ==
ISO	Name	Nickname	UFC record	Birthplace	Fighting Out Of	Team	UFC Debut	Notes
POL	Karolina Kowalkiewicz		9–10	Łódź, Poland	Łódź, Poland	Shark Top Team Łódź	19/12/2015	
POL	Izabela Badurek		0–1	Lublin, Poland	Warsaw, Poland	Herkules Łęczna	11/04/2015	
POL	Joanna Jędrzejczyk		10–5	Olsztyn, Poland	Olsztyn, Poland	Arrachion Olsztyn	26/07/2014	Former UFC Women's Strawweight Champion.

== See also ==
- List of UFC champions
- List of current Konfrontacja Sztuk Walki fighters
