= Cyców-Kolonia Pierwsza =

- Village
- Location within Poland
- Coordinates: 51°17′31″N 23°7′51″E
- Country: Poland
- Voivodeship: Lublin
- County: Łęczna
- Gmina: Cyców

Cyców-Kolonia Pierwsza [ˈt͡sɨt͡suf kɔˈlɔɲa ˈpjɛrfʂa] is a village in the administrative district of Gmina Cyców, within Łęczna County, Lublin Voivodeship, in eastern Poland.
