= Biesiadki, Lublin Voivodeship =

Biesiadki
- Village
- Location within Poland
- Coordinates: 51°17′N 23°9′E
- Country: Poland
- Voivodeship: Lublin
- County: Łęczna
- Gmina: Cyców
- Time zone: UTC+1 (CET)
  - Summer (DST): UTC+2 (CEST)

Biesiadki [bjɛˈɕatki] is a village in the administrative district of Gmina Cyców, within Łęczna County, Lublin Voivodeship, in eastern Poland.

== History ==
Three Polish citizens were murdered by Nazi Germany in the village during World War II.
