= Ciechanki Łęczyńskie =

- Village
- Location within Poland
- Coordinates: 51°17′N 22°53′E
- Country: Poland
- Voivodeship: Lublin
- County: Łęczna
- Gmina: Łęczna

Ciechanki Łęczyńskie [t͡ɕɛˈxanki wɛnˈt͡ʂɨɲskʲɛ] is a village in the administrative district of Gmina Łęczna, within Łęczna County, Lublin Voivodeship, in eastern Poland.

== History ==
Ciechanki Łęczyńskie was initially one village recorded in 1409 as Maciej de Czekanky.

In 1419 the village was divided between Stanisław and Maciej, the former of whom received part after Krzesimów and the latter after Trębaczów.

In the 15th century parish of Łęczna, the village of altera Czyechanki was recorded, which in 1531 bore the name "Ciechanki Smotyanka".
