= Wólka Nadrybska =

- Village
- Location within Poland
- Coordinates: 51°21′21″N 23°04′52″E
- Country: Poland
- Voivodeship: Lublin
- County: Łęczna
- Gmina: Cyców
- Area code: (+48) 82
- Vehicle registration: LLE

Wólka Nadrybska [ˈvulka naˈdrɨpska] is a village in the administrative district of Gmina Cyców, within Łęczna County, Lublin Voivodeship, in eastern Poland.
