= Ruda Mała =

- Village
- Location within Poland
- Coordinates: 51°19′N 21°4′E
- Country: Poland
- Voivodeship: Masovian
- County: Radom
- Gmina: Kowala

Ruda Mała [ˈruda ˈmawa] is a village in the administrative district of Gmina Kowala, within Radom County, Masovian Voivodeship, in east-central Poland.
