= Młodocin Mniejszy =

- Village
- Location within Poland
- Coordinates: 51°21′N 21°2′E
- Country: Poland
- Voivodeship: Masovian
- County: Radom
- Gmina: Kowala
- Elevation: 190 m (620 ft)
- Population: 1,000

Młodocin Mniejszy [mwɔˈdɔt͡ɕin ˈmɲɛi̯ʂɨ] is a village in the administrative district of Gmina Kowala, within Radom County, Masovian Voivodeship, in east-central Poland.
