= 7th Lublin Uhlan Regiment =

Polish Army regiment

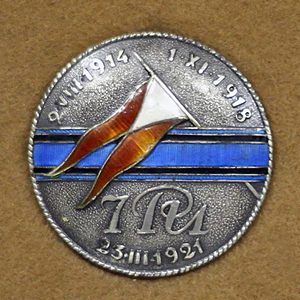
- Badge of the regiment
- Active: October 1918 – 2 October 1939; December 1940 – 29 September 1944; 24 December 1944 – 2 September 1949
- Country: Poland
- Branch: Masovian Cavalry Brigade (1939); Home Army (1940-1944); 3rd Carpathian Rifle Division (1944-1947)
- Type: Uhlan
- Role: Cavalry
- Garrison/HQ: Mińsk Mazowiecki (1918-1939); Galatina (January 1945-October 1945); Grottammare (October 1945-1946)
- Engagements: Polish-Ukrainian War; Polish-Soviet War: Battle of Cyców; World War II: Invasion of Poland; Battle of Tomaszów Lubelski; Operation Tempest; Warsaw Uprising; Battle of Jaktorów; Italian Campaign

7th Lublin Uhlan Regiment of General Kazimierz Sosnkowski (Polish: 7 Pułk Ułanów Lubelskich im. gen. Kazimierza Sosnkowskiego, 7 puł) was a cavalry unit of the Polish Army in the Second Polish Republic and in the Polish Armed Forces in the West. Until 1939, it was garrisoned in Mińsk Mazowiecki. The day of the regiment was on March 23, the anniversary of the decoration of its flag with the Virtuti Militari.

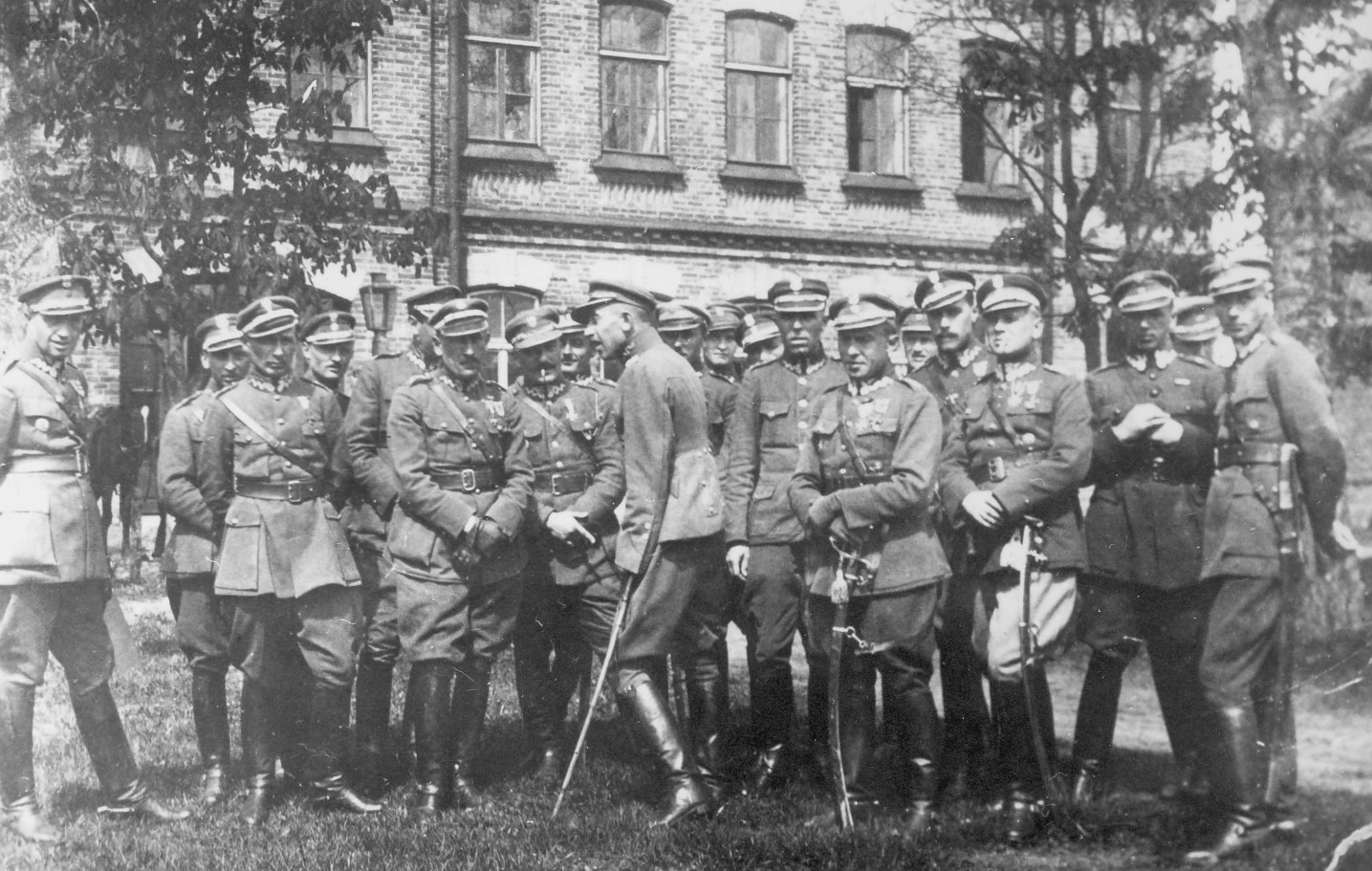
Major Zygmunt Piasecki, Commander of the 7th Uhlan Regiment, among the regimental officers.

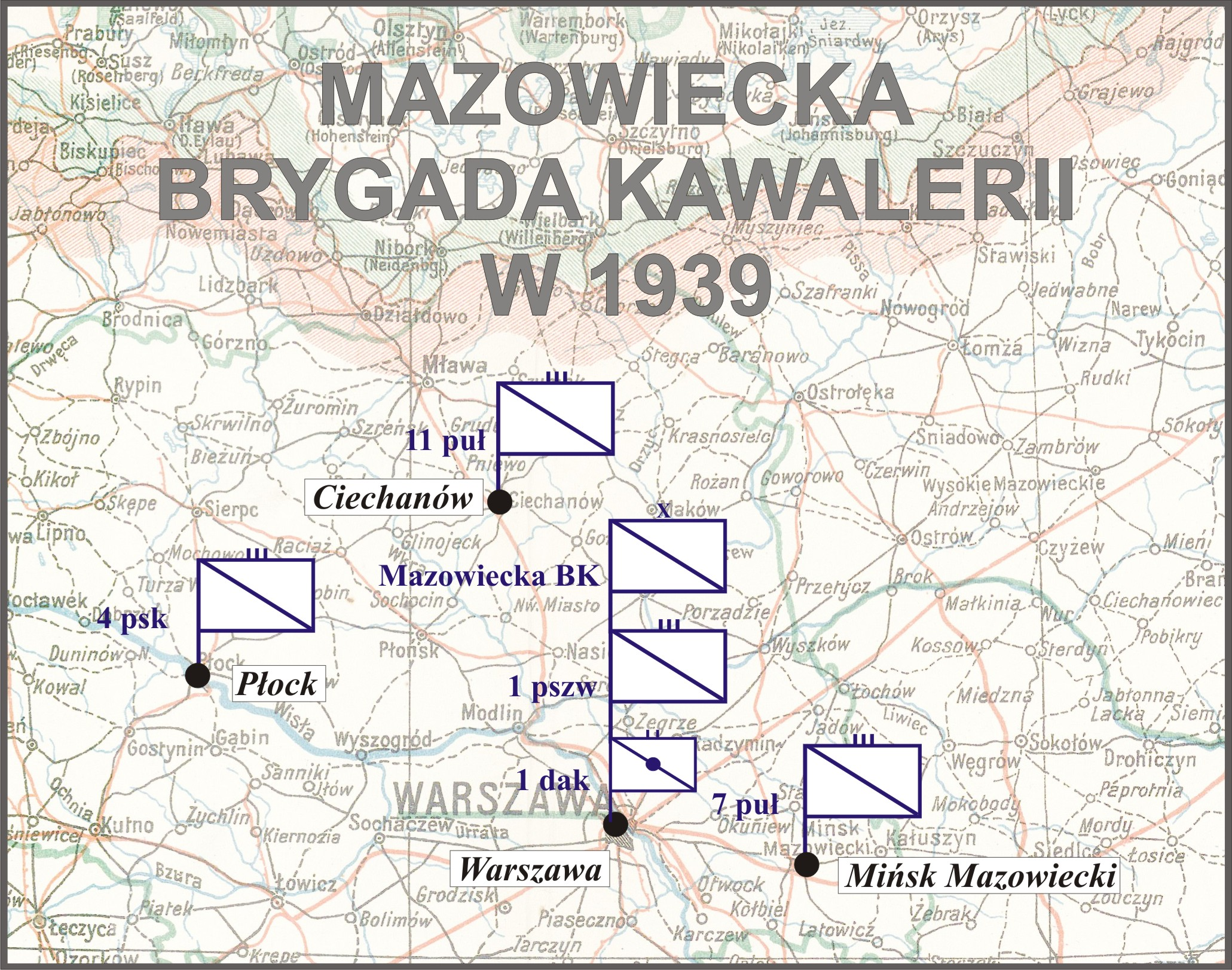
Mazowiecka BK w 1938

The regiment was named after General Kazimierz Sosnkowski, who accepted the name on March 4, 1920. For 17 years it was unofficial, until November 21, 1937, when Ministry of Military Affairs officially accepted the full name: 7th Regiment of Lublin Uhlans of General Kazimierz Sosnkowski.

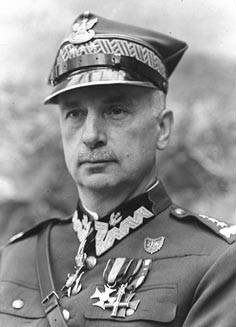
General Kazimierz Sosnkowski

== History ==
The regiment was formed in October 1918 in Lublin and Chełm, by a group of officers of Polish Legions 1st Uhlan Regiment, commanded by Wladyslaw Belina-Prazmowski (see Polish Legions in World War I). The officers decided to form three cavalry regiments in former Austrian part of Congress Poland.

The headquarters of the Lublin regiment was located in the barracks of Austrian uhlans in Lublin, its 1st and 2nd squadrons were located in Zamość, while 3rd squadron together with a machine gun squadron were garrisoned in Kraśnik.

On November 23, 1918, the regiment concentrated in Kraśnik, to be sent by rail to the Ukrainian front in eastern part of former Austrian Galicia. It fought the enemy in several locations, and on December 30, was renamed into 7th Lublin Uhlan Regiment.

On February 26, 1919, the regiment was transported northwards, to the area of Slonim and Lida, where it fought against the Red Army. In July 1919 it captured the rail junction of Molodeczno, to advance eastwards, and finally reach the line of the Berezina river. On November 23 the regiment was sent to the rear to rest and recuperate. It returned to the front on January 25, 1920, and patrolled the rail line from Riga to Daugavpils. In April it was incorporated into the 1st Cavalry Brigade, and on June 28 was resent southwards, this time to Volhynia. On July 4, 1920, near Rowne, the 1st Cavalry Brigade fought a prolonged battle against 1st Cavalry Army (Soviet Union) of Semyon Budyonny. In mid-August 1920 the regiment was sent to the area of Rejowiec, where it joined 4th Cavalry Brigade, with which it fought in the Battle of Cycow.

On August 31, Lublin Uhlans entered Suwałki, repelling Lithuanian attacks. On September 22 it destroyed Lithuanian units near Marycha, and on October 3, it destroyed elements of Red Army's 27th Rifle Division.

== Second Polish Republic ==
The regiment remained on the Polish–Soviet demarcation line until February 12, 1921. On that day it marched to the railhead of Molodeczno, to be transported back to Kraśnik. In March some of its soldiers were sent home, in April the regiment was moved to Przasnysz, and in June, Polish military authorities decided that the regiment would be permanently garrisoned in Mińsk Mazowiecki – the uhlans arrived there on June 21. In the winter of 1922 – 23, elements of the regiment were sent to Eastern Galicia, to prevent the acts of sabotage, carried out there by Ukrainian nationalists.

== World War II ==
=== Invasion of Poland ===
The mobilization of the regiment was announced on August 24, 1939, at 1 a.m. By 4 p.m. on August 25, the all squadrons were ready. On the next day, regimental commandant, Colonel Leonard Lodzia-Michalski was transferred to the 10th Motorized Cavalry Brigade (Poland). Under new commandant, Colonel Marian Skrzynecki, the regiment marched northwards, to the border with East Prussia. It took its defensive positions on August 30, and the soldiers began digging trenches, protected by barbed wire.

During the 1939 Invasion of Poland, Lublin Uhlans were part of Mazowiecka Cavalry Brigade, Army Modlin. On September 1–3, it fought in exposed defensive position near Chorzele, to be withdrawn to Przasnysz. On September 5–7, it defended the line of the Narew river. After crossing the Bug river, it fought in the area of Lublin, suffering heavy losses in the battle of Suchowola (September 23–24).

In the final days of September 1939, elements of the regiment kept fighting both the Wehrmacht and the Red Army, trying to reach either the border with Hungary, or the garrison of besieged Warsaw. During one of the clashes against the Soviets, its commandant, Colonel Marian Skrzynecki, was mortally wounded. Last soldiers of the regiment continued fighting until October 9, when they capitulated near Mińsk Mazowiecki.

=== After the fall of Poland ===
7th Regiment of Lublin Uhlans was recreated by the Home Army in December 1940. Its units fought in Operation Tempest and Warsaw Uprising but the regiment was destroyed on 29 September 1944 during the Battle of Jaktorów. Later, the 7th Lublin Uhlans regiments was reformed on 24 December 1944 in Mercato Saraceno as an armoured regiment of the 3rd Carpathian Rifle Division. The regiment was disbanded on 2 September 1949.

== Commandants of the Lublin Uhlans ==
- Major Janusz Gluchowski (XI 1918 – VII 1920)
- Colonel Zygmunt Piasecki (VII 1920 – III 1929)
- Colonel Jan Tyczynski (III 1929 – X 1930)
- Colonel Julian Filipowicz (X 1930 – VI 1935)
- Colonel Leonard Lodzia-Michalski (4 VII 1935 – VIII 1939)
- Colonel Marian Skrzynecki (VIII – IX 1939)
- Lech Głuchowski (December 1940 – 15 September 1944 †)
- Lieutenant Colonel Bronisław Mokrzycki (19 January 1945 – 2 September 1947)

== Symbols ==
The flag of the regiment, funded by the residents of the Land of Lublin, was handed to it by General Sosnkowski in Kraśnik, on March 22, 1921. On the next day, in appreciation of the bravery of the soldiers, the flag was decorated by Józef Piłsudski with Silver Cross of the Virtuti Militari. On August 26, 1939, the flag was taken with the regiment to the frontline. It returned to Mińsk Mazowiecki on September 6. Saved by two soldiers, the flag was buried in the ground in the village of Nowodworze, where it remained until November 1959. It now is kept at the Polish Army Museum in Warsaw.

The badge was accepted by the military authorities on March 18, 1929. It was designed by Zygmunt Piasecki, and manufactured by Jozef Kweksilber and Wiktor Gontarczyk from Warsaw.

The regiment had its own zurawiejka.

== Sources ==
- Janusz Odziemkowski: 7 Pułk Ułanów Lubelskich im. gen. Kazimierza Sosnkowskiego. Warszawa: Mikromax, 1989. ISBN 83-00-03216-9.

== See also ==
- Polish cavalry
