= Kotarwice =

- Village
- Location within Poland
- Coordinates: 51°20′25″N 21°6′52″E
- Country: Poland
- Voivodeship: Masovian
- County: Radom
- Gmina: Kowala
- Population: 600

Kotarwice [kɔtarˈvit͡sɛ] is a village in the administrative district of Gmina Kowala, within Radom County, Masovian Voivodeship, in east-central Poland.
