= Trablice =

- Village
- Location within Poland
- Coordinates: 51°21′N 21°8′E
- Country: Poland
- Voivodeship: Masovian
- County: Radom
- Gmina: Kowala
- Population: 1,100

Trablice [traˈblit͡sɛ] is a village in the administrative district of Gmina Kowala, within Radom County, Masovian Voivodeship, in east-central Poland.
