= Barki, Poland =

Barki
- Village
- Location within Poland
- Coordinates: 51°15′36″N 23°5′38″E
- Country: Poland
- Voivodeship: Lublin
- County: Łęczna
- Gmina: Cyców
- Population: 290

Barki [ˈbarki] is a village in the administrative district of Gmina Cyców, within Łęczna County, Lublin Voivodeship, in eastern Poland.

The village is home to mixed martial artist Michał Oleksiejczuk.
