= Romanów, Gmina Kowala =

Village in Gmina Kowala, Poland

Romanów
- Village
- Location within Poland
- Coordinates: 51°18′17″N 21°06′14″E
- Country: Poland
- Voivodeship: Masovian
- County: Radom
- Gmina: Kowala

Romanów [rɔˈmanuf] is a village in the administrative district of Gmina Kowala, within Radom County, Masovian Voivodeship, in east-central Poland.
