= Battle of Cyców =

Coordinates: 51°17′59″N 23°09′00″E

- Part of Polish–Bolshevik War
| Date | 15th – 16th August 1920 |
| Location | Cyców |
| Result | Polish victory |

Belligerents
| Second Polish Republic | (Russian Soviet Federative Socialist Republic) Russian SFSR |

Commanders and leaders
| Cyprian Bystram | Dotol |

Units involved
| 3rd and 7th uhlan regiments, 2 full-time battalions, 2nd horse artillery division | 514th and 155th Rifle Regiments, cavalry unit and artillery battery |

Strength
| 928 sabers, 900 bayonets, 34 machine guns, 8 guns | ~1,550 bayonets, 235 sabers, 40 machine guns, 4 guns |

Casualties and losses
| 27 killed, 58 wounded, 55 horses killed | Unknown |

The Battle of Cyców (Polish: Bitwa pod Cycowem) took place during the Polish-Bolshevik War on 15 and 16 August 1920. It is one of the battles that constitute a larger operation commonly referred to as the battle of Warsaw. It occurred in the fields surrounding the village of Cyców, some 45 kilometres (28 mi) east of Lublin.

== Background ==
The Polish plan for the Battle of Warsaw was based on two assumptions: that Warsaw would withstand a direct assault by Red Army's forces and that the corps-sized Assault Group under direct command of Gen. Józef Piłsudski gain enough time to concentrate behind Wieprz river and prepare a counter-offensive. For the latter to be possible, the Polish forces near Lublin and Zamość (Polish 3rd Army) had to prevent the Bolshevik South-Western Front from reaching the battlefield.

== Battle ==
On 15 August the forces of 58th Rifle Division (514th and 155th Rifle Regiments, reinforced with cavalry and artillery, some 1,550 first-line troops and 235 cavalrymen all together) arrived to the area north of Cyców. The Polish forces in the area consisted of elements of the 4th Cavalry Brigade (Third Silesian Uhlan Regiment and 7th Regiment of Lublin Uhlans), reinforced with mounted artillery battalion and two reserve battalions of infantry. All together, Maj. Cyprian Bystram (CO of 3rd Uhlans' Regiment and temporary commander of the Polish 4th Brigade) had 928 cavalrymen and 900 infantrymen at his command. The regular brigade commander Lieutenant Colonel Adam Nieniewski did not arrive until the evening of 16 August. The brigade's other regiment, the 16th Uhlans did not join it until 18 August.

The Soviet forces assaulted the Polish infantry along the road leading towards Lublin, near Garbatówka. The Polish units, composed mainly of rear echelon troops and lightly wounded servicemen from nearby field hospitals, offered stiff resistance for the remainder of the day. Despite numerical superiority, it was not until the following morning that the Russians finally broke through the Polish lines and entered Cyców, in pursuit of the fleeing remnants of the Polish infantry battalions. At Głębokie however, the Polish infantry made another stand, this time helped by mobile artillery of the 2nd Artillery Battalion.

The 7th Uhlans arrived at Cyców on 16 August, a reconnaissance patrol freed some Polish prisoners being led to the rear. At 5.10pm, Bystram ordered an attack by infantry along the road to Głębokie and Cyców with the 3rd Uhlands on the left flank and the 7th Uhlands on the right. The 7th Uhlans captured Cyców without resistance but came under machine gun fire when crossing a drainage ditch. By bringing to bear their own machine guns the regiment was able to achieve superiority and force the Russians to flee, taking several dozen prisoners for the loss of one man killed and two wounded. The 7th Uhlans pressed on towards Wólka Cycowska, capturing 18 prisoners near Abramówka. They reached Świerszczew at dusk and encountered resistance, with two men wounded, and withdrew.

The 3rd Uhlans occupied hills near Biesiadka upon which the Russians made their main counterattack. The 3rd Uhlans and some Polish infantry who had regrouped after the initial Russian assault were pushed back. An attack on their flank by a dismounted squadron of the 7th Uhlans caused concern among the Russian forces and another squadron launched a cavalry charge that caused many Russians to flee. Marshy terrain allowed some Russians to stand and fire on the cavalry, killing the Polish squadron commander, two officers and five men and wounded 14 others (and 40 horses).

The remaining two squadrons of the 7th Uhlans opened fire on the retreating Russians, causing heavy losses. A group of 50 Russian cavalrymen arrived at the battle and beat a hasty retreat when an ad hoc force of 20 Polish cavalry, scraped together from the headquarters detachment of the 7th Uhlans advanced on them. The 7th Uhlans captured Wólka Cycowska where they spent the night. The next day they captured Garbatówka. The regiment alone captured 100 prisoners, 5 machine guns, 150 rifles and 6 horses. The retreating Russian 172nd Brigade ran into the Polish 3rd Legions Infantry Division near Sobibór on 17 August and was shattered, with four artillery pieces captured and 100 prisoners taken.

The battle of Cyców is featured on the Tomb of the Unknown Soldier in Warsaw.

== Maps ==
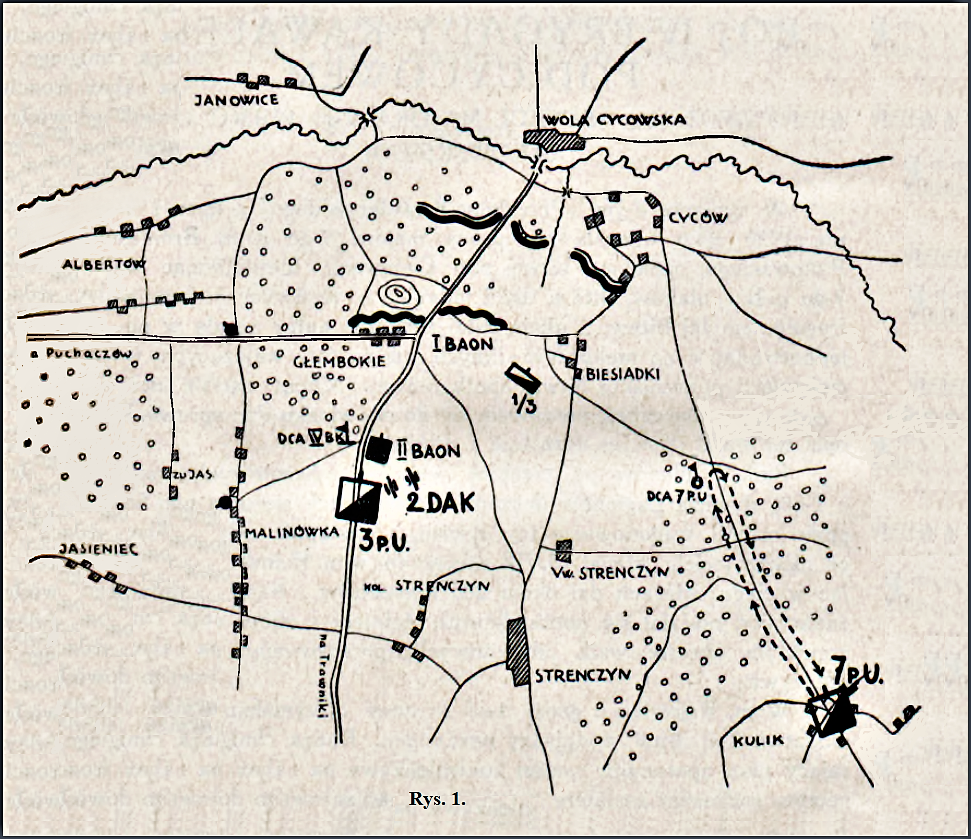
10:30

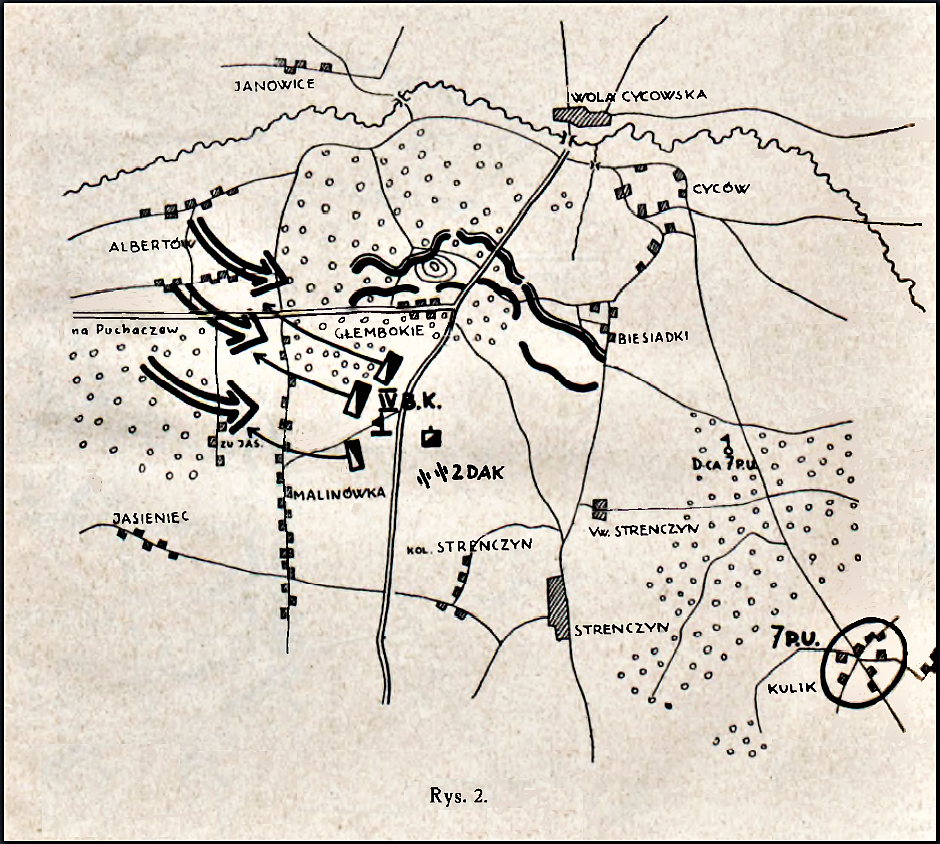
16:00

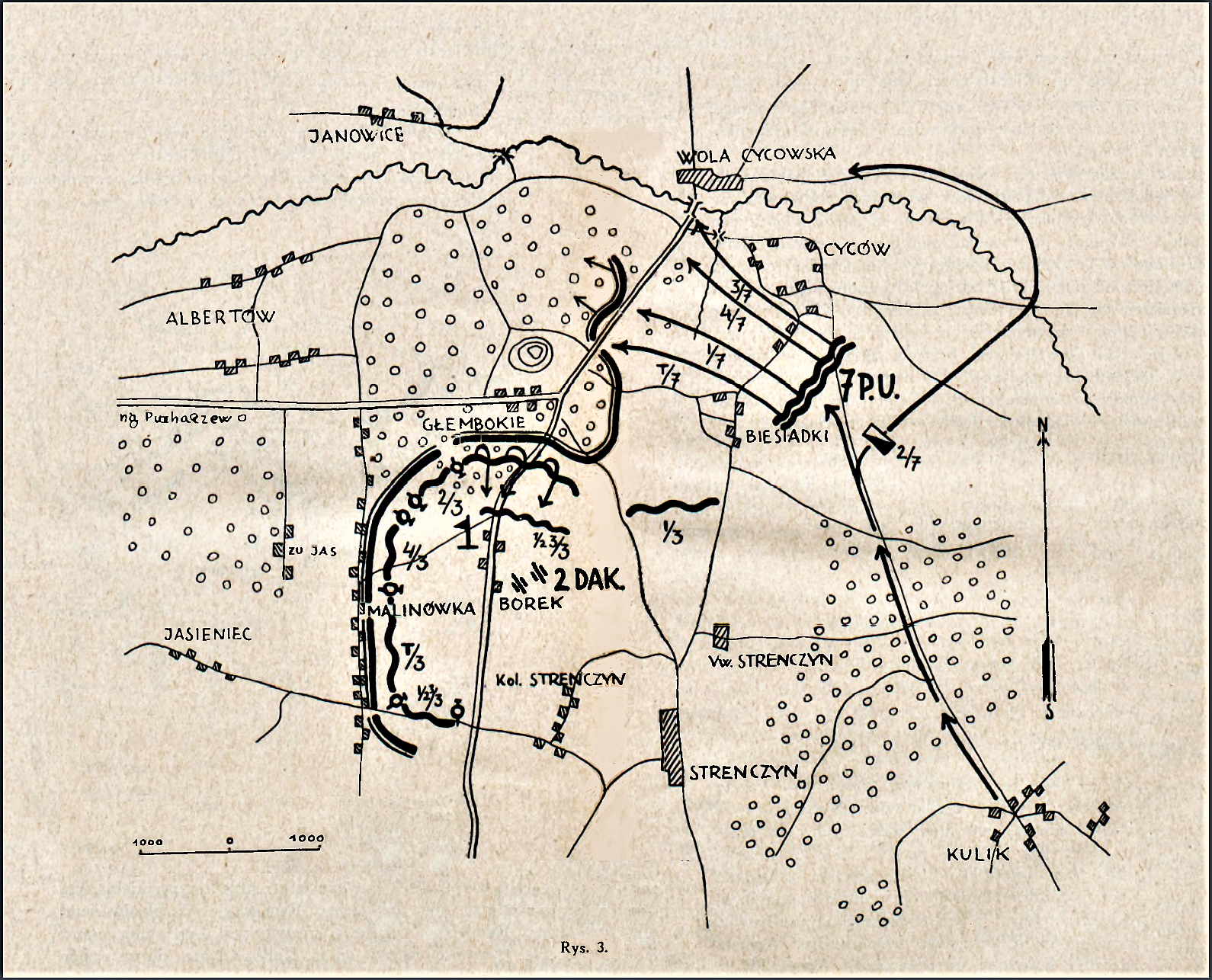
17:30
