= Kowala, Masovian Voivodeship =

Kowala
- Village
- Location within Poland
- Coordinates: 51°19′29″N 21°4′13″E
- Country: Poland
- Voivodeship: Masovian
- County: Radom
- Gmina: Kowala
- Population: 990

Kowala [kɔˈvala] is a village in Radom County, Masovian Voivodeship, in east-central Poland. It is the seat of the gmina (administrative district) called Gmina Kowala.
