= Gmina Cyców =

Gmina Cyców Cyców Commune
- Gmina
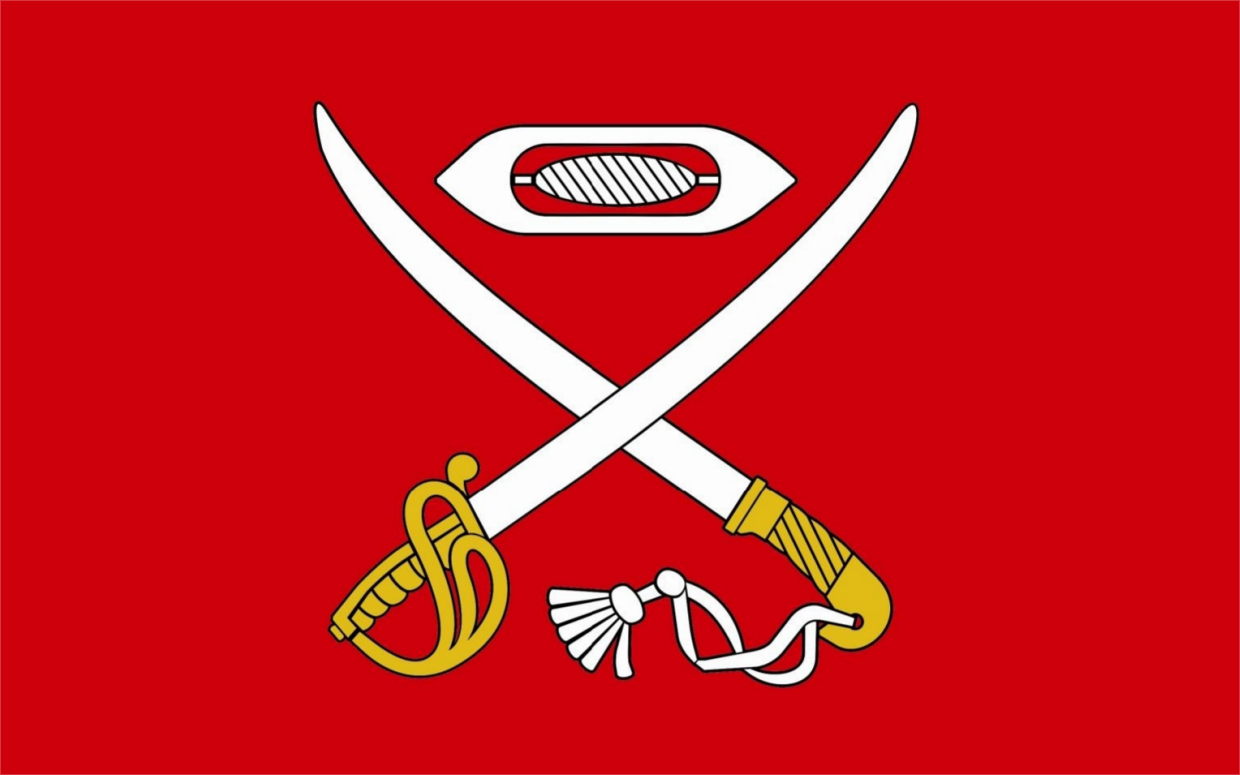
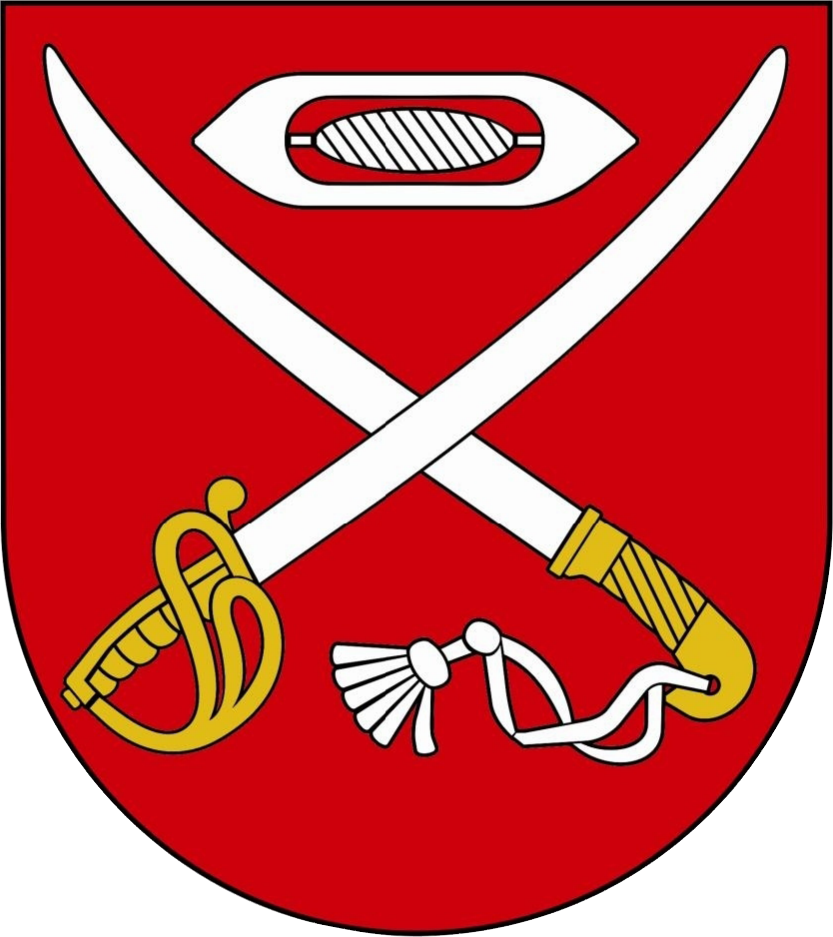
- Flag Coat of arms
- Interactive map of Gmina Cyców
- Coordinates (Cyców): 51°18′N 23°9′E
- Country: Poland
- Voivodeship: Lublin
- County: Łęczna
- Seat: Cyców

Area
  - Total: 147.87 km^{2} (57.09 sq mi)

Population (2015)
  - Total: 7,931
  - Density: 53.63/km^{2} (138.9/sq mi)
- Website: https://ugcycow.pl/

Gmina Cyców is a rural gmina (administrative district) in Łęczna County, Lublin Voivodeship, in eastern Poland. Its seat is the village of Cyców, which lies approximately 19 kilometres (12 mi) east of Łęczna and 41 km (25 mi) east of the regional capital Lublin.

The gmina covers an area of 147.87 square kilometres (57.1 sq mi), and as of 2006 its total population is 7,516 (7,931 in 2015).

== Villages ==
Gmina Cyców contains the villages and settlements of Adamów, Barki, Bekiesza, Biesiadki, Cyców, Cyców-Kolonia Druga, Cyców-Kolonia Pierwsza, Garbatówka, Garbatówka-Kolonia, Głębokie, Janowica, Kopina, Ludwinów, Malinówka, Małków, Nowy Stręczyn, Ostrówek Podyski, Podgłębokie, Sewerynów, Stary Stręczyn, Stawek, Stawek-Kolonia, Stefanów, Świerszczów, Świerszczów-Kolonia, Szczupak, Wólka Cycowska, Wólka Nadrybska, Zagórze, Zaróbka and Zosin.

== Neighbouring gminas ==
Gmina Cyców is bordered by the gminas of Ludwin, Puchaczów, Siedliszcze, Urszulin and Wierzbica.
