= Ludwinów, Łęczna County =

Ludwinów
- Village
- Location within Poland
- Coordinates: 51°16′14″N 23°13′23″E
- Country: Poland
- Voivodeship: Lublin
- County: Łęczna
- Gmina: Cyców

Ludwinów [ludˈvinuf] is a village in the administrative district of Gmina Cyców, within Łęczna County, Lublin Voivodeship, in eastern Poland.
