= Stara Wieś, Gmina Łęczna =

Stara Wieś
- Village
- Location within Poland
- Coordinates: 51°18′32″N 22°53′33″E
- Country: Poland
- Voivodeship: Lublin
- County: Łęczna
- Gmina: Łęczna

Stara Wieś [ˈstara ˈvjɛɕ] is a village in the administrative district of Gmina Łęczna, within Łęczna County, Lublin Voivodeship, in eastern Poland.
