= Gmina Łęczna =

Gmina Łęczna Łęczna Commune
- Gmina
- Coat of arms
- Interactive map of Gmina Łęczna
- Coordinates (Łęczna): 51°18′N 22°53′E
- Country: Poland
- Voivodeship: Lublin
- County: Łęczna
- Seat: Łęczna

Area
  - Total: 74.9 km^{2} (28.9 sq mi)

Population (2015)
  - Total: 23,623
  - Density: 315/km^{2} (817/sq mi)
  - Urban: 19,437
  - Rural: 4,186
- Website: http://www.leczna.pl/

Gmina Łęczna is an urban-rural gmina (administrative district) in Łęczna County, Lublin Voivodeship, in eastern Poland. Its seat is the town of Łęczna, which lies approximately 23 kilometres (14 mi) east of the regional capital Lublin.

The gmina covers an area of 74.9 square kilometres (28.9 sq mi), and as of 2006 its total population is 25,178 (out of which the population of Łęczna amounts to 21,689, and the population of the rural part of the gmina is 3,489).

== Villages ==
Apart from the town of Łęczna, Gmina Łęczna contains the villages and settlements of Ciechanki Krzesimowskie, Ciechanki Łęczyńskie, Karolin, Leopoldów, Łuszczów-Kolonia, Nowogród, Piotrówek Drugi, Podzamcze, Rossosz, Stara Wieś, Stara Wieś-Kolonia, Stara Wieś-Stasin, Trębaczów, Witaniów, Zakrzów and Zofiówka.

== Neighbouring gminas ==
Gmina Łęczna is bordered by the gminas of Ludwin, Mełgiew, Milejów, Puchaczów, Spiczyn and Wólka.
