= Grabina, Gmina Kowala =

Grabina
- Village
- Location within Poland
- Coordinates: 51°16′58″N 21°8′3″E
- Country: Poland
- Voivodeship: Masovian
- County: Radom
- Gmina: Kowala
- Population: 240

Grabina [ɡraˈbina] is a village in the administrative district of Gmina Kowala, within Radom County, Masovian Voivodeship, in east-central Poland.
