= Świerszczewo =

Świerszczewo may refer to:

- Świerszczewo, Kołobrzeg County
- Świerszczewo, Szczecinek County

== See also ==
- Świerczów (disambiguation)
- Świerszczów (disambiguation)
