= Podzamcze, Łęczna County =

Podzamcze
- Village
- Location within Poland
- Coordinates: 51°18′54″N 22°52′56″E
- Country: Poland
- Voivodeship: Lublin
- County: Łęczna
- Gmina: Łęczna
- Time zone: UTC+1 (CET)
  - Summer (DST): UTC+2 (CEST)

Podzamcze [pɔˈd͡zamt͡ʂɛ] is a village in the administrative district of Gmina Łęczna, within Łęczna County, Lublin Voivodeship, in eastern Poland.

== History ==
Nine Polish citizens were murdered by Nazi Germany in the village during World War II.
