= Mazowszany =

- Village
- Location within Poland
- Coordinates: 51°20′30″N 21°7′47″E
- Country: Poland
- Voivodeship: Masovian
- County: Radom
- Gmina: Kowala

Mazowszany [mazɔfˈʂanɨ] is a village in the administrative district of Gmina Kowala, within Radom County, Masovian Voivodeship, in east-central Poland.
