= Kończyce-Kolonia =

- Village
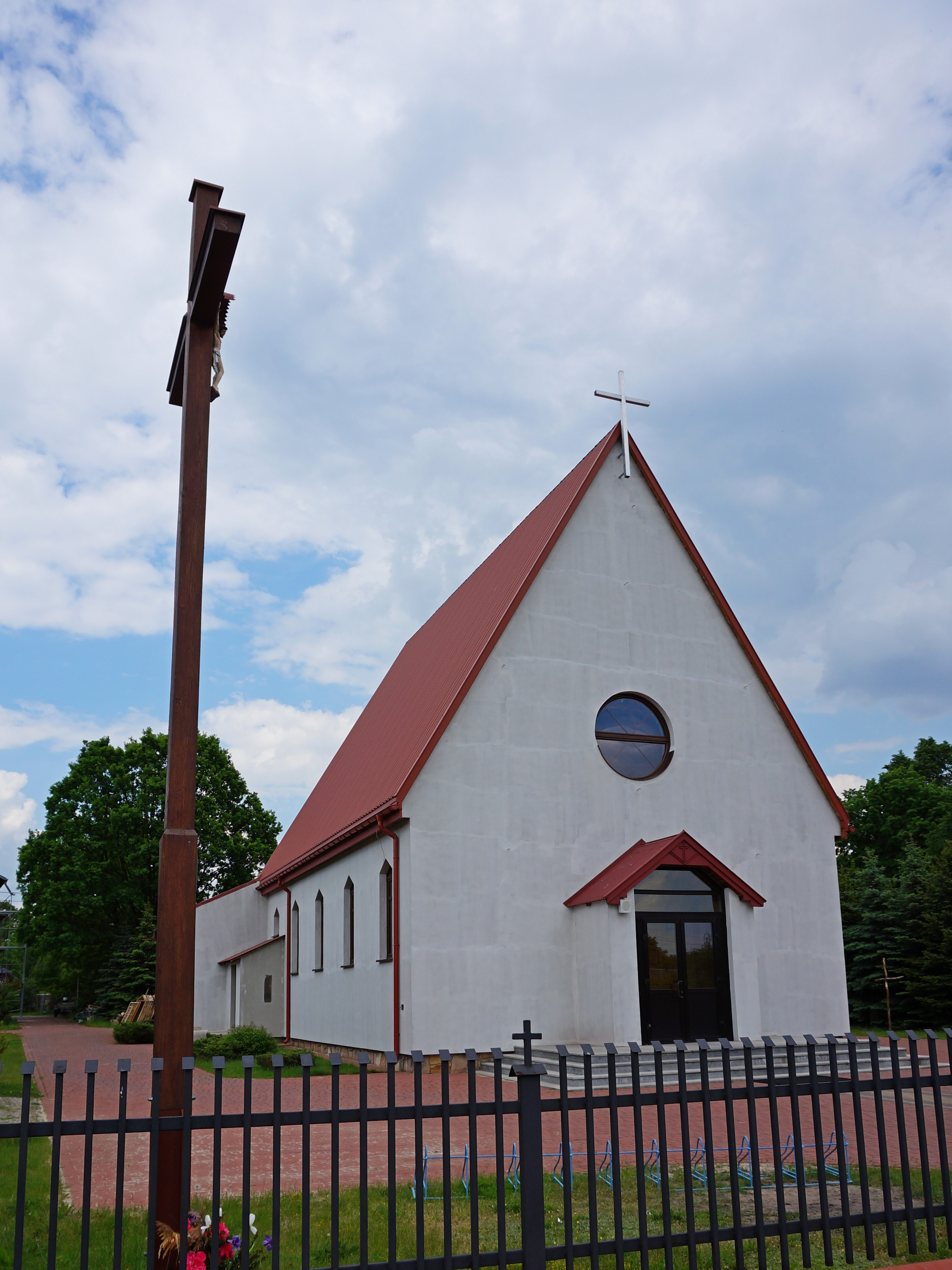
- Church in Kończyce-Kolonia

- Location within Poland
- Coordinates: 51°21′58″N 21°03′27″E
- Country: Poland
- Voivodeship: Masovian
- County: Radom
- Gmina: Kowala

Kończyce-Kolonia [kɔɲˈt͡ʂɨt͡sɛ kɔˈlɔɲa] is a village in the administrative district of Gmina Kowala, within Radom County, Masovian Voivodeship, in east-central Poland.
