= Rożki, Masovian Voivodeship =

Rożki
- Village
- Location within Poland
- Coordinates: 51°20′4″N 21°2′35″E
- Country: Poland
- Voivodeship: Masovian
- County: Radom
- Gmina: Kowala
- Population: 550

Rożki [ˈrɔʂki] is a village in the administrative district of Gmina Kowala, within Radom County, Masovian Voivodeship, in east-central Poland.
