= Świerszczów-Kolonia =

- Village
- Location within Poland
- Coordinates: 51°21′1″N 23°9′32″E
- Country: Poland
- Voivodeship: Lublin
- County: Łęczna
- Gmina: Cyców
- Population: 200

Świerszczów-Kolonia (Polish pronunciation: [ˈɕfjɛrʂt͡ʂuf kɔˈlɔɲa]) is a village in the administrative district of Gmina Cyców, within Łęczna County, Lublin Voivodeship, in eastern Poland.

== History ==
From 1975 to 1998, the village was part of the Chełm Voivodeship. Following the 1999 Polish administrative reform, it became part of the present-day Lublin Voivodeship.
