= Cyców =

- Village
- Location within Poland
- Coordinates: 51°18′N 23°9′E
- Country: Poland
- Voivodeship: Lublin
- County: Łęczna
- Gmina: Cyców
- Population (2026): 1,734
- Postal Code: 21-070
- Area Code: (+48) 82
- Vehicle registration: LLE

Cyców [ˈt͡sɨt͡suf] is a village in Łęczna County, Lublin Voivodeship, in eastern Poland. It is the seat of the gmina (administrative district) called Gmina Cyców.

== History ==
Battle of Cyców took place there in 1920.

== Geography ==
The village is located in eastern Poland, in the Lublin Voivodeship, within Łęczna County.
