= Gmina Kowala =

Gmina Kowala Kowala Commune
- Gmina
- Coat of arms
- Interactive map of Gmina Kowala
- Coordinates (Kowala): 51°19′29″N 21°4′13″E
- Country: Poland
- Voivodeship: Masovian
- County: Radom County
- Seat: Kowala

Area
  - Total: 74.71 km^{2} (28.85 sq mi)

Population (2006)
  - Total: 10,631
  - Density: 142.3/km^{2} (368.5/sq mi)
- Website: http://www.kowala.pl/

Gmina Kowala is a rural gmina (administrative district) in Radom County, Masovian Voivodeship, in east-central Poland. Its seat is the village of Kowala, which lies approximately 11 kilometres (7 mi) south-west of Radom and 100 km (62 mi) south of Warsaw.

The gmina covers an area of 74.71 square kilometres (28.8 sq mi), and as of 2006 its total population is 10,631.

== Villages ==
Gmina Kowala contains the villages and settlements of Augustów, Bardzice, Dąbrówka Zabłotnia, Grabina, Huta Mazowszańska, Kończyce-Kolonia, Kosów, Kotarwice, Kowala, Ludwinów, Maliszów, Mazowszany, Młodocin Mniejszy, Parznice, Romanów, Rożki, Ruda Mała and Trablice.

== Neighbouring gminas ==
Gmina Kowala is bordered by the city of Radom and by the gminas of Orońsko, Skaryszew, Wierzbica and Wolanów.
