= Świerczów =

Świerczów may refer to:

- Świerczów, Lower Silesian Voivodeship (south-west Poland)
- Świerczów, Łódź Voivodeship (central Poland)
- Świerczów, Subcarpathian Voivodeship (south-east Poland)
- Świerczów, Świętokrzyskie Voivodeship (south-central Poland)
- Świerczów, Opole Voivodeship (south-west Poland)

== See also ==
- Świerszczów (disambiguation)
- Świerszczewo (disambiguation)
