= Świerszczów, Łęczna County =

Świerszczów
- Village
- Location within Poland
- Coordinates: 51°20′19″N 23°10′59″E
- Country: Poland
- Voivodeship: Lublin
- County: Łęczna
- Gmina: Cyców

Świerszczów (Polish pronunciation: [ˈɕfjɛrʂt͡ʂuf]) is a village in the administrative district of Gmina Cyców, within Łęczna County, Lublin Voivodeship, in eastern Poland.
