= Dąbrówka Zabłotnia =

- Village
- Location within Poland
- Coordinates: 51°19′N 21°3′E
- Country: Poland
- Voivodeship: Masovian
- County: Radom
- Gmina: Kowala

Dąbrówka Zabłotnia [dɔmˈbrufka zaˈbwɔtɲa] is a village in the administrative district of Gmina Kowala, within Radom County, Masovian Voivodeship, in east-central Poland.

== History ==
The village was founded in the 14th century. Coat of arms records from 1377 mention Piotr z Dąbrówka, a Sandomierz scribe. Piotr z Dąbrówka used the Nieczuja coat of arms as his seal. In 1416, the village belonged to the brothers: Stanisław and Marcisz. The next known heirs of the village were: Mikołaj, Jakub, Paweł and Prokop of the Nieczuja coat of arms, mentioned in the years 1422-1444. Mikołaj Serafin became a Kraków juror in 1410 and the mayor of Przemyśl in 1444. The name of this village comes from the word "dąbrowa" meaning a pine forest and from the word "nabłotny" meaning a place lying "behind the mud".

Source references from the 16th century spell the name of the village differently. In 1516 it was Zablotna Dambrowska and in 1529, Dabrowska Zablothna. At the end of the 15th century, Andrzej of the Nieczuja coat of arms, heir to Dąbrówka, is recorded. Andrzej's descendants, inheriting the village, adopted the surname Dąbrowski from the family name of the village. In 1508, the heir to the village was Jakub Dąbrowski, and the census from 1569 shows that the owners of the village were: Andrzej Dąbrowski and Stanisław and Katarzyna Dąbrowscy. Shortly afterwards, the whole of Dąbrówka fell into the hands of the powerful Parys family from Mazovia. Later, like many villages in the area, Dąbrówka Zabłotnia belonged to the Piasecki and Rudzki families, and at the end of the 18th century to the Czermiński family.

In 1827, the village had 15 residential houses and 109 inhabitants. In the first half of the 19th century, the Dąbrówka Zabłotnia estate included the Dąbrówka and Helenów farms, and covered 645 morgas of land. The estate included two brick buildings and 10 wooden buildings. There were limestone deposits, which were mined and processed using lime kilns. In the second half of the 19th century, the Dąbrówka Zabłotnia estate was divided among peasants. The residents of Dąbrówka Zabłotnia were allocated 18 agricultural plots on 137 morgas of land, and the residents of Helenów 9 agricultural plots on 170 morgas of land. The remaining part of the farm land in Dąbrówka was sold to colonists. Dąbrówka Zabłotnia belonged to the Kowala commune from 1864.

According to the 1921 census, Dąbrówka Zabłotnia village had 30 residential buildings and Dąbrówka Zabłotnia Kolonia had 23 residential houses. The village includes the Załawie hamlet, a settlement established in the second half of the 19th century on the territory of one of the nearby farms. Załawie certainly existed in 1884, when it was listed among the villages belonging to the Kowala commune. In 1921, there were 10 residential houses here.
