= Kopina, Łęczna County =

Kopina
- Village
- Location within Poland
- Coordinates: 51°20′N 23°8′E
- Country: Poland
- Voivodeship: Lublin
- County: Łęczna
- Gmina: Cyców

Kopina [kɔˈpina] is a village in the administrative district of Gmina Cyców, within Łęczna County, Lublin Voivodeship, in eastern Poland.
