= Suchowola, Zamość County =

Suchowola
- Village
- Location within Poland
- Coordinates: 50°35′N 23°14′E
- Country: Poland
- Voivodeship: Lublin
- County: Zamość
- Gmina: Adamów

Population
  - Total: 2,000

Suchowola [suxɔˈvɔla] is a village in the administrative district of Gmina Adamów, within Zamość County, Lublin Voivodeship, in eastern Poland.
