= Stefan Strzemieński =

Stefan Marian Strzemieński was a general of the Polish Army, who participated in the Polish September Campaign. Born in 1885, he gained the command of a cavalry brigade in the early 1920s, and then of the garrison of Warsaw. Strzemieński retired in 1932, but was recalled to the army in 1939, becoming commandant of the Operational Group Dubno. Strzemieński was taken prisoner by the Germans and passed the remainder of the war in a POW camp. He was released in 1945, he died in 1955. The location of neither his birth nor his death is known.
