= Ludwinów, Radom County =

Ludwinów
- Village
- Location within Poland
- Coordinates: 51°20′49″N 21°05′41″E
- Country: Poland
- Voivodeship: Masovian
- County: Radom
- Gmina: Kowala
- Time zone: UTC+1 (CET)
  - Summer (DST): UTC+2 (CEST)

Ludwinów [ludˈvinuf] is a village in the administrative district of Gmina Kowala, within Radom County, Masovian Voivodeship, in east-central Poland.

Six Polish citizens were murdered by Nazi Germany in the village during World War II.
