= Augustów, Gmina Kowala =

Augustów
- Village
- Location within Poland
- Coordinates: 51°20′43″N 21°7′2″E
- Country: Poland
- Voivodeship: Masovian
- County: Radom
- Gmina: Kowala

Augustów [auˈɡustuf] is a village in the administrative district of Gmina Kowala, within Radom County, Masovian Voivodeship, in east-central Poland.
