= Stara Wieś, Hrubieszów County =

Stara Wieś
- Village
- Location within Poland
- Coordinates: 50°36′N 23°51′E
- Country: Poland
- Voivodeship: Lublin
- County: Hrubieszów
- Gmina: Mircze
- Website: www.starawies.rtu.pl

Stara Wieś [ˈstara ˈvjɛɕ] is a village in the administrative district of Gmina Mircze, within Hrubieszów County, Lublin Voivodeship, in eastern Poland, close to the border with Ukraine.
