= 4th Cavalry Brigade (Poland) =

The IV Cavalry Brigade (Polish IV Brygada Kawalerii) was a unit of the Polish Army during the Polish-Bolshevik War and later in the inter-war period. It was commanded by Major Feliks Jaworski and then by Colonel Adam Nieniewski.

During the Battle of Warsaw it fought in the ranks of the 4th Polish Army of Józef Piłsudski and largely contributed to the success of Piłsudski's manoeuvre that outflanked the Bolshevik forces near Warsaw. During the initial phase of the battle, the brigade fought the Battle of Cyców against the forces of the Bolshevist 172nd Rifle Brigade. A successful cavalry charge broke the enemy lines and allowed the Poles to proceed with the assault. In that battle the brigade captured approximately 70 prisoners and 5 MGs.

After the battle, the brigade was attached to the assault group of Rydz-Śmigły's 2nd Army and took part in the Battle of the Niemen. It also formed the core of the Polish areas defending Suwałki during the Polish-Lithuanian War.
