= Łęczna County =

Łęczna County Powiat łęczyński
- County
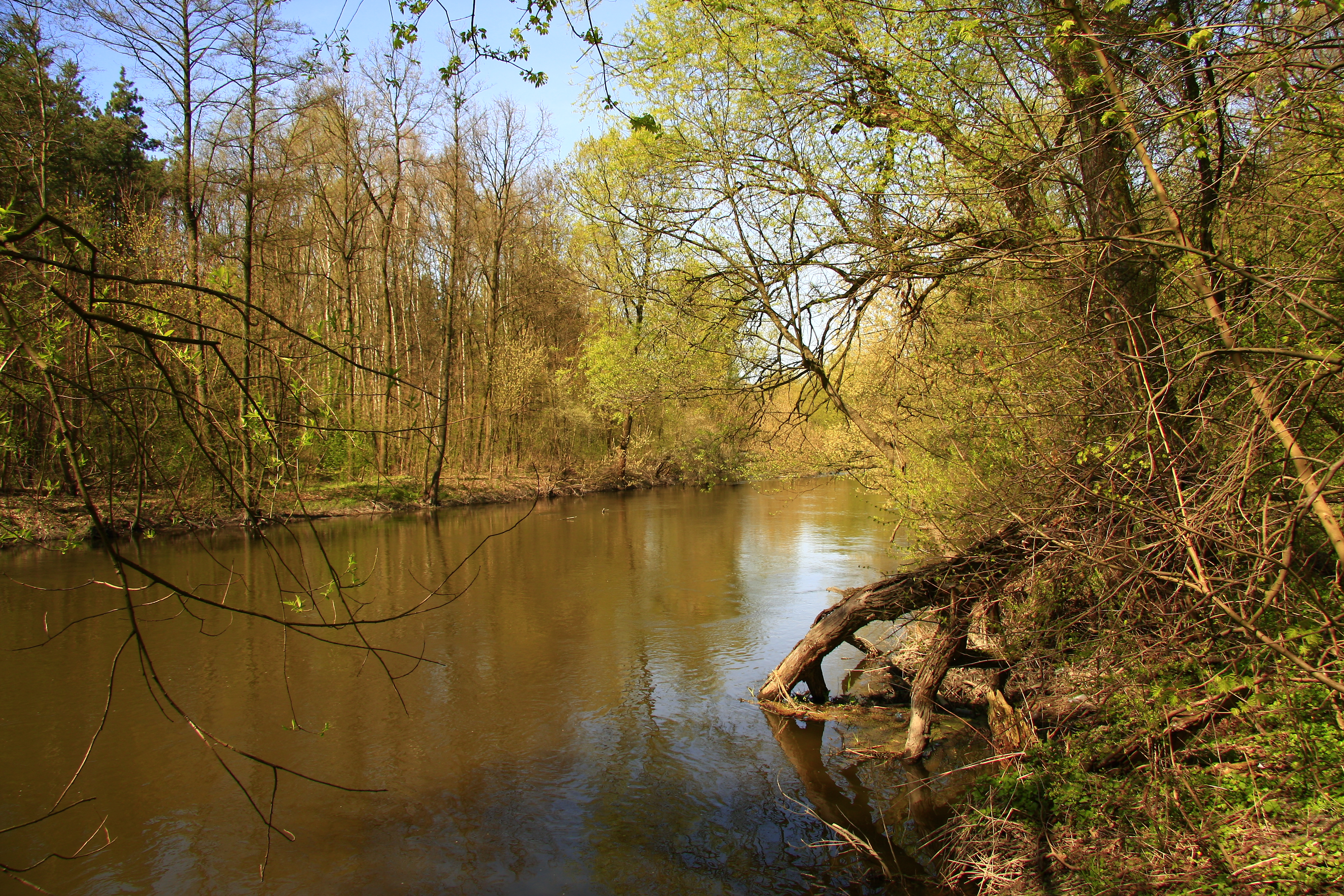
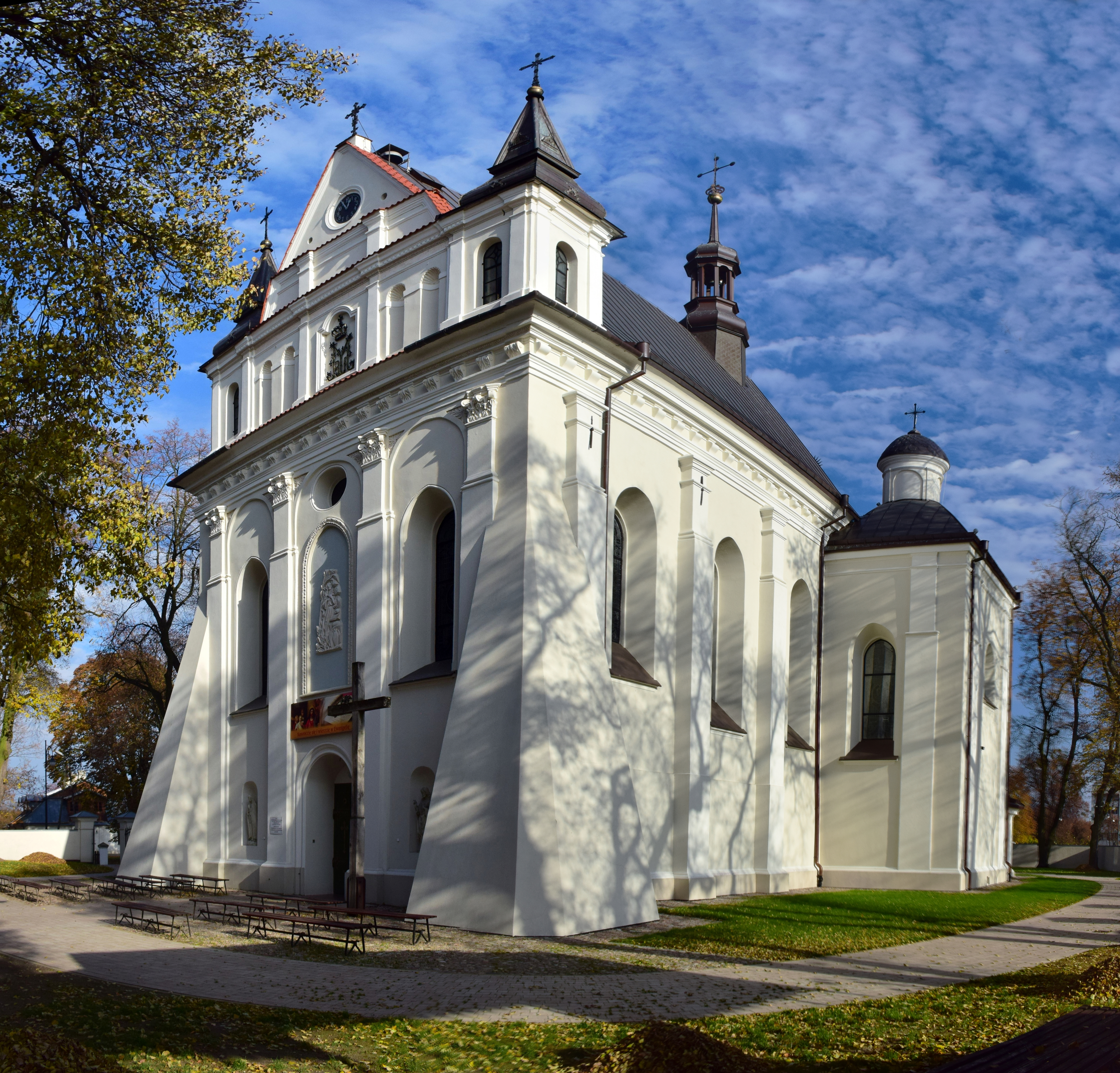
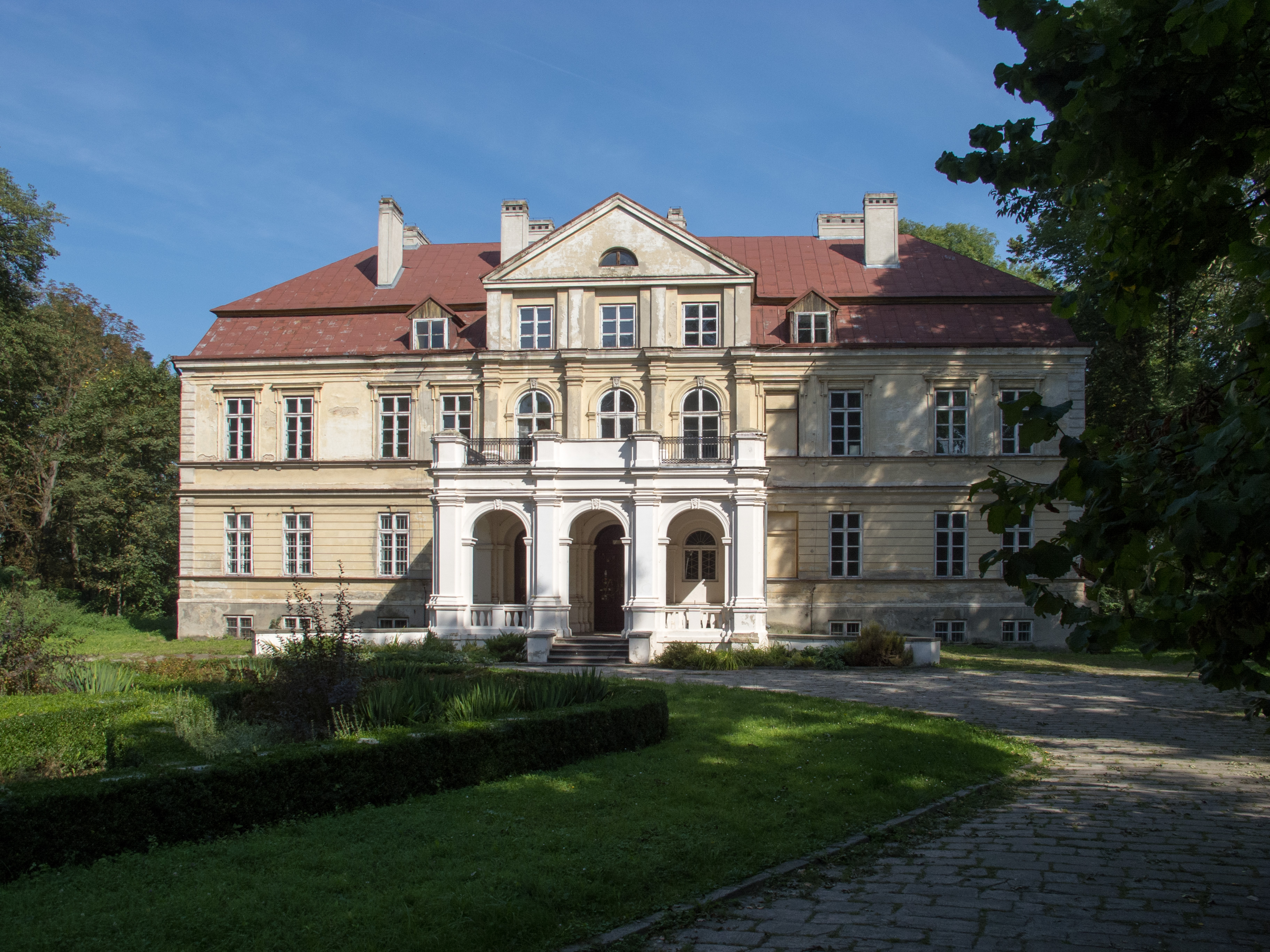
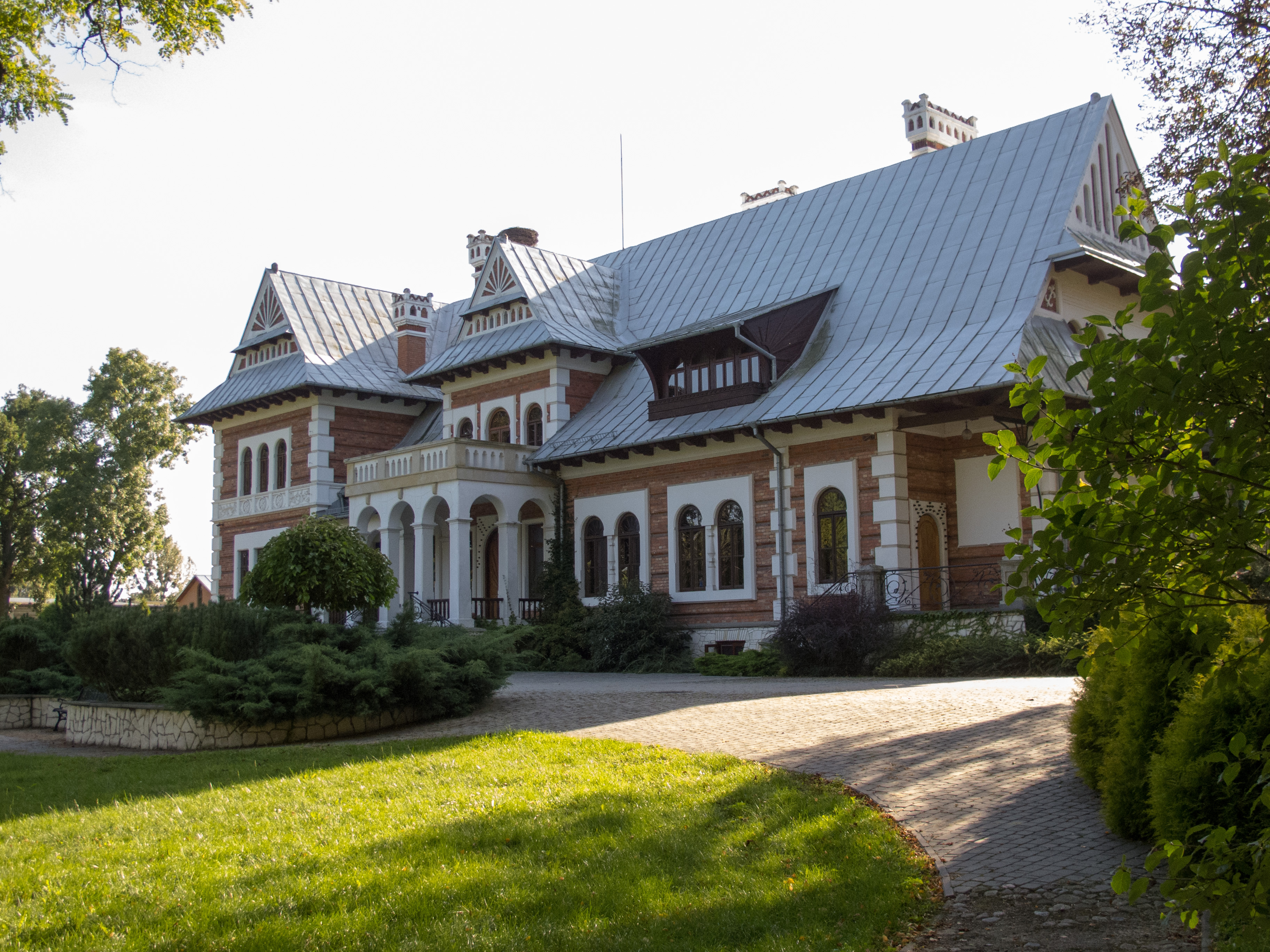
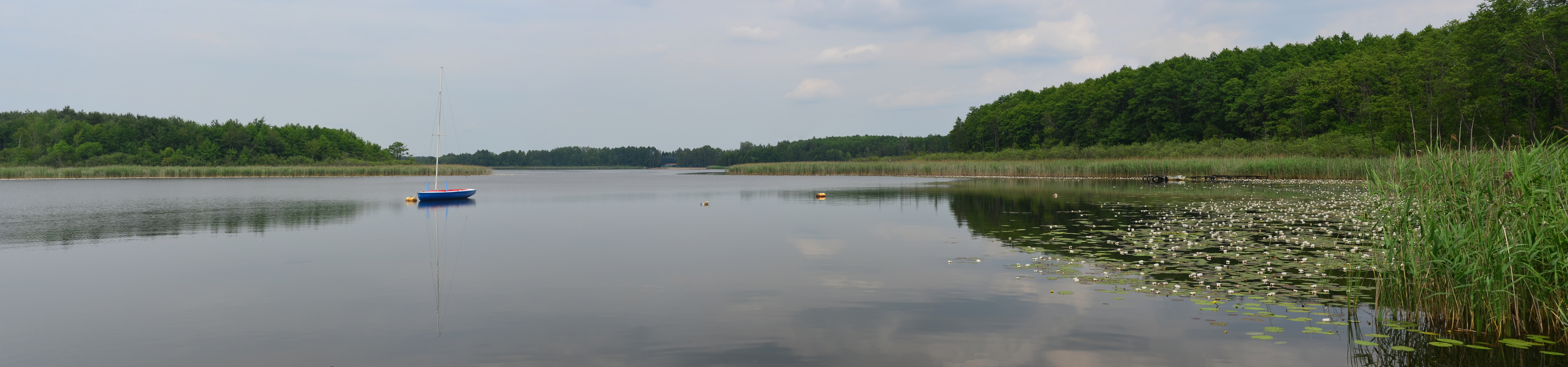
- Wieprz River Valley Mary Magdalene church in Łęczna Palace in Kijany Old manor in Łańcuchów Łukcze Lake

- Flag Coat of arms

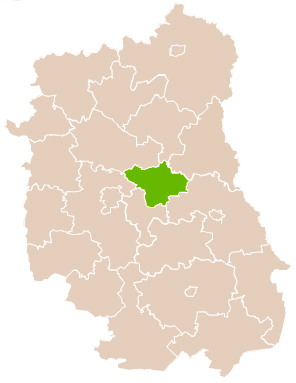
- Location within the voivodeship
- Coordinates (Łęczna): 51°18′N 22°53′E
- Country: Poland
- Voivodeship: Lublin
- Seat: Łęczna
- Gminas: Total 6: Gmina Cyców; Gmina Łęczna; Gmina Ludwin; Gmina Milejów; Gmina Puchaczów; Gmina Spiczyn

Area
  - Total: 633.75 km^{2} (244.69 sq mi)

Population (2019)
  - Total: 57,372
  - Density: 90.528/km^{2} (234.47/sq mi)
  - Urban: 18,884
  - Rural: 38,488
- Time zone: UTC+1 (CET)
  - Summer (DST): UTC+2 (CEST)
- Car plates: LLE
- Website: www.leczna.pl

Łęczna County (Polish: powiat łęczyński) is a unit of territorial administration and local government (powiat) in Lublin Voivodeship, eastern Poland. It was established on January 1, 1999, as a result of the Polish local government reforms passed in 1998. Its administrative seat and only town is Łęczna, which lies 23 kilometres (14 mi) east of the regional capital Lublin.

The county covers an area of 633.75 square kilometres (244.7 sq mi). As of 2019, its total population is 57,372, out of which the population of Łęczna is 18,884 and the rural population is 38,488.

== Neighbouring counties ==
Łęczna County is bordered by Parczew County to the north, Włodawa County and Chełm County to the east, Świdnik County to the south-west, Lublin County to the west, and Lubartów County to the north-west.

== Administrative divisions ==
The county is subdivided into six gminas (one urban-rural and five rural). These are listed in the following table, in descending order of population.

Gmina	Type	Area (km^{2})	Population (2019)	Seat
Gmina Łęczna	urban-rural	74.9	23,300	Łęczna
Gmina Milejów	rural	115.7	9,085	Milejów-Osada
Gmina Cyców	rural	147.9	7,968	Cyców
Gmina Spiczyn	rural	83.1	5,720	Spiczyn
Gmina Ludwin	rural	120.5	5,620	Ludwin
Gmina Puchaczów	rural	91.7	5,679	Puchaczów

== Popular culture ==
The county is a featured locale in the Codemasters racing game DiRT Rally 2.0.
