= Kobyłki, Lublin Voivodeship =

Kobyłki
- Village
- Location within Poland
- Coordinates: 51°22′N 23°0′E
- Country: Poland
- Voivodeship: Lublin
- County: Łęczna
- Gmina: Ludwin
- Time zone: UTC+1 (CET)
  - Summer (DST): UTC+2 (CEST)

Kobyłki [kɔˈbɨu̯ki] is a village in the administrative district of Gmina Ludwin, within Łęczna County, Lublin Voivodeship, in eastern Poland.

Name of Kobyłki, the most closely can be translated as "Mares".

== History ==
14 Polish citizens were murdered by Nazi Germany in the village during World War II.

In mid 1990s the area south of Kobyłki had enjoyed minor mining damage, the cause was quite close neighborhood of Bogdanka Coal Mine and its large-scale operations, and as the result the least urbanized parts of the village are planned to be sunk, seamlessly expanding an artificial lake.

== Nature and agriculture ==
The area is rich in open landscapes, natural resources, including number of fish (close proximity to Nadrybie), and rare species of birds living on Pojezierze Łęczyńskie. The area has been focused on sustainable development, observing a slight decrease in the reliance on agriculture, in favor of agrotourism serving residents of near-by Łęczna, and Lublin area.

The community hosts number of farmers who grow apples, strawberries, pears, currants, raspberries, gooseberries, tobacco, corn, beer hops and various other crops.
