= Zawadów (disambiguation) =

Zawadów may refer to:

- Zawadów, Łódź Voivodeship
- Zawadów, Lublin Voivodeship
- Polish name of Ukrainian locations named Zavadiv
