= Zdzisław Broński =

Polish Army reserve officer

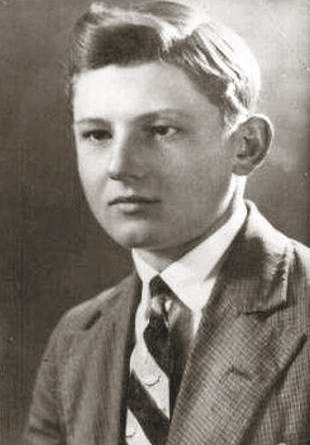
- Born: 24 December 1912; Stary Radzic, Poland
- Died: 21 May 1949 (aged 36); Nowogród, Polish People's Republic
- Cause of death: Grenade explosion
- Other name: "Uskok" (Jumper)
- Occupation: military personnel

Zdzisław Broński (nom de guerre "Uskok" (Jumper)) (24 December 1912 – 21 May 1949) was a reserve officer of the Polish Army, member of ZWZ and the Home Army, one of the partisan leaders of the anti-communist underground Freedom and Independence, WiN, in the Lublin region.

== World War II ==
He took part in the Invasion of Poland in 1939, fighting against Nazi Germany. He was captured and sent to a POW camp from which he escaped, most likely in November 1940. After coming back to his home region he joined a small resistance group Polska Organizacja Zbrojna (Armed Polish Organization) which later became part of the Polish Home Army (AK). He was made the commander of a 35 men platoon in the sub-region of Stary Radzic, AK Region "Lubartów", in the Inspectorate of Lublin.

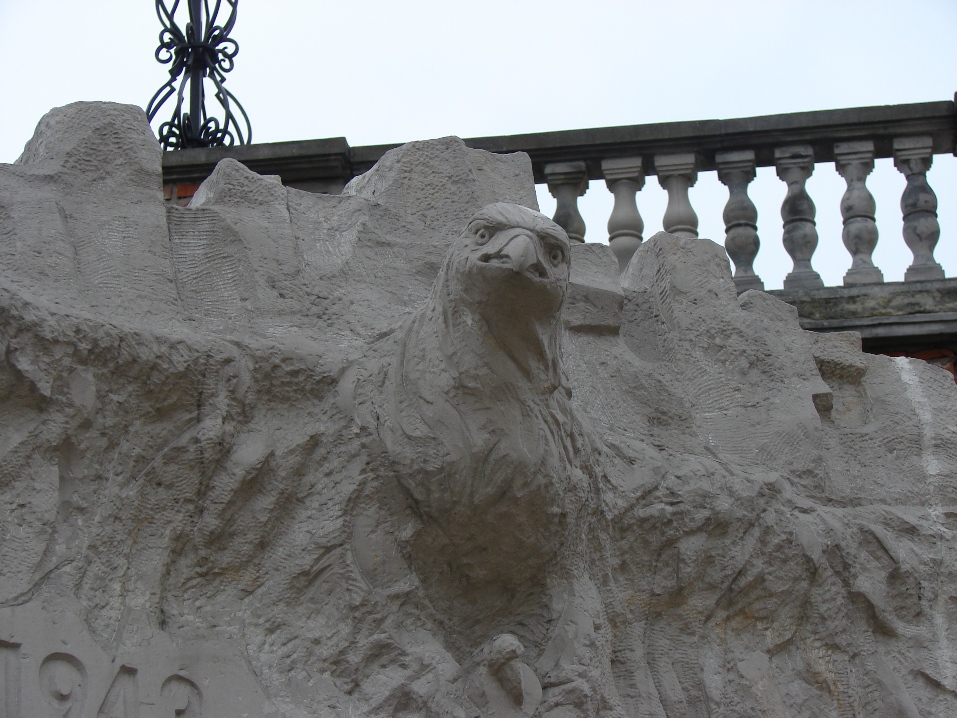
A monument to Hieronim Dekutowski, Zdzisław Broński and their soldiers, at the foot of the Lublin Castle

== In the underground ==
At the end of 1943, after a series of arrests of local underground anti-Nazi activists, and threatened with arrest himself, Broński organized a partisan group and "went to the forest". In May 1944 it was formally made into a flying column of the 8th Regiment of Infantry of AK Legions. Originally the column numbered 40 partisans but in the next few months it grew in numbers. During this time, the regiment was stationed in the forests around Zawieprzyce, Kozłowiec and Parczew. Also in May he was promoted to lieutenant. In June his unit was made part of the 27 Volhynian Infantry Division.

On the 16th of July, the division, for which Broński's unit served in the role of scouts, found themselves surrounded by German forces, in a large scale anti-partisan action. As a result, the partisans had to quickly move to the region of Czemierniki forests.

During Operation Tempest, the Broński unit took part in the fighting as the 3rd Company of the IV Battalion of the 8th Regiment "Lublin".

== Back in the underground ==
After the Red Army entered Poland, Zdzisław managed to evade arrest (for being a former AK member). He disbanded his unit and initially declared his willingness to join the Soviet controlled People's Army of Poland. However, when he learned that he was sought after by communist authorities he went back underground. From August 1944 he served as first second in command, and then the commander of the I AK Region "Lubartów". In the winter of 1945, based on the unit that he had under German occupation, he recreated his flying column of several dozen men, which became part of the "Freedom and Independence" (WiN) organization. On June 1, 1945, he was promoted to the rank of lieutenant.

On May 25, 1946, the new inspector of the Win Inspectorate "Lublin" Franciszek Abraszewski ("Boruta") made Broński the commander of the Operational Region Lubartów. As a result, all the partisan groups and squads operating in the region now came under Broński's command, and he himself came under the direct command of Major Hieronim Dekutowski ("Zapora"). In October 1946, "Uskok's" group took control of Łęczna, capturing the local headquarters of the milicja (MO), and in December, together with the unit of Leon Taraszkiewicz ("Jastrząb" (Hawk)), in a reprisal action, his unit took part in pacification of the village of Rozkopaczew where several buildings were burned.

After the new Polish authorities declared an amnesty, under the February 22, 1947, statute of amnesty, for all military groups that were still refusing to acknowledge their power, Broński seriously considered leaving the underground. In his group he left the individual decisions to his subordinates. Successive commanders of the Lublin District of Win — col. Wilhelm Szczepankiewicz ps. "Drugak" and Franciszek Żak ps. "Wir" — had also encouraged him to come out of hiding. However, eventually he decided to remain in conspiracy and still carry out military actions against the new authorities. His operations were aimed not only against the state officials (UB, MO), but also against civilians. Often his group attacked and killed those civilians who supported the new authorities or even sympathised with their actions.

For example, on May 1, 1947, "Uskok's" group shot seven members of the ZWM youth organization, who were returning from the May Day parade. Among the victims were: Paweł Budka (aged 20), Zdzisław Czubacki (aged 19), Zygmunt Duda (aged 18), Mieczysław Jesionek (aged 15), Bolesław Lipta (aged 22), Bolesława Skrzypaczka (aged 27) and Zygmunt Żembski (aged 23). However, the most infamous action of his troops was the slaughter of the inhabitants of the village Puchaczów. This action was conducted by squads that were under the command of "Uskok", led by: "Wiktor", "Żelazny" and Józef Strug ps. "Ordon". In their opinion, the sufficient justification for this action was that three identified inhabitants of the village gave away the location of hiding of three "Uskok's" partisans to the new authorities. Despite the fact that it was known who reported the partisans, the whole village was pacified and 21 of its inhabitants were shot. A complete list of the future victims was prepared beforehand. Broński himself considered the slaughter as bloody but necessary.

On 20 May 1949, officers of the Ministry of Public Security arrested Bronski's deputy, Zygmunt Libera, who revealed the hiding place of his commander. The following day, a group of MB officers surrounded Bronski's hideout, and killed him using a grenade.

At one point one of the sub-commanders in Broński's group was Józef Franczak who later would become the last of the "Cursed soldiers" to remain in the underground, fighting communist authorities until 1963.

== Awards, Decorations and Citations ==
He was a recipient of the Cross of Virtuti Militari.
