= Gmina Ludwin =

Gmina Ludwin Ludwin Commune
- Gmina
- Flag Coat of arms
- Interactive map of Gmina Ludwin
- Coordinates (Ludwin): 51°20′N 22°54′E
- Country: Poland
- Voivodeship: Lublin
- County: Łęczna
- Seat: Ludwin

Area
  - Total: 120.51 km^{2} (46.53 sq mi)

Population (2015)
  - Total: 5,443
  - Density: 45.17/km^{2} (117.0/sq mi)
- Website: http://www.ludwin.lubelskie.pl

Gmina Ludwin is a rural gmina (administrative district) in Łęczna County, Lublin Voivodeship, in eastern Poland. Its seat is the village of Ludwin, which lies approximately 4 kilometres (2 mi) north of Łęczna and 25 km (16 mi) east of the regional capital Lublin.

The gmina covers an area of 120.51 square kilometres (46.5 sq mi), and as of 2006 its total population is 4,985 (5,443 in 2015).

The gmina contains part of the protected area called Łęczna Lake District Landscape Park.

== Villages ==
Gmina Ludwin contains the villages and settlements of Czarny Las, Dąbrowa, Dratów, Dratów-Kolonia, Jagodno, Kaniwola, Kobyłki, Kocia Góra, Krzczeń, Ludwin, Ludwin-Kolonia, Piaseczno, Rogóźno, Rozpłucie Drugie, Rozpłucie Pierwsze, Stary Radzic, Uciekajka, Zezulin Drugi, Zezulin Niższy and Zezulin Pierwszy.

== Neighbouring gminas ==
Gmina Ludwin is bordered by the gminas of Cyców, Łęczna, Ostrów Lubelski, Puchaczów, Sosnowica, Spiczyn, Urszulin and Uścimów.
