= Rogozno (disambiguation) =

Rogoźno is a town in Greater Poland Voivodeship, west-central Poland.

Rogozno may also refer to the following places:

- Rogóźno, Kuyavian-Pomeranian Voivodeship (north-central Poland)
- Rogóźno, Łask County in Łódź Voivodeship (central Poland)
- Rogóźno, Łowicz County in Łódź Voivodeship (central Poland)
- Rogóźno, Zgierz County in Łódź Voivodeship (central Poland)
- Rogóźno, Łęczna County in Lublin Voivodeship (east Poland)
- Rogóźno, Gmina Tomaszów Lubelski, Tomaszów County, Lublin Voivodeship (east Poland)
- Rogóźno, Masovian Voivodeship (east-central Poland)
- Rogóźno, Greater Poland Voivodeship (west-central Poland)
- Rogóżno, Subcarpathian Voivodeship (south-east Poland)
