= Gmina Puchaczów =

Gmina Puchaczów Puchaczów Commune
- Gmina
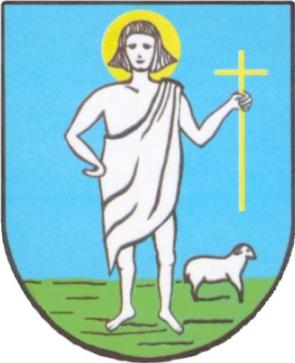
- Coat of arms
- Interactive map of Gmina Puchaczów
- Coordinates (Puchaczów): 51°18′N 22°58′E
- Country: Poland
- Voivodeship: Lublin
- County: Łęczna
- Seat: Puchaczów

Area
  - Total: 91.70 km^{2} (35.41 sq mi)

Population (2015)
  - Total: 5,513
  - Density: 60.12/km^{2} (155.7/sq mi)
- Website: http://www.puchaczow.lubelskie.pl/

Gmina Puchaczów is a rural gmina (administrative district) in Łęczna County, Lublin Voivodeship, in eastern Poland. Its seat is the village of Puchaczów, which lies approximately 6 kilometres (4 mi) east of Łęczna and 29 km (18 mi) east of the regional capital Lublin.

The gmina covers an area of 91.70 square kilometres (35.4 sq mi), and as of 2006 its total population is 4,887 (5,513 in 2015).

The gmina contains part of the protected area called Łęczna Lake District Landscape Park.

== Villages ==
Gmina Puchaczów contains the villages and settlements of Albertów, Bogdanka, Brzeziny, Ciechanki, Ciechanki-Kolonia, Jasieniec, Nadrybie Ukazowe, Nadrybie-Dwór, Nadrybie-Wieś, Ostrówek, Puchaczów, Stara Wieś, Szpica, Turowola, Turowola-Kolonia, Wesołówka and Zawadów.

== Neighbouring gminas ==
Gmina Puchaczów is bordered by the gminas of Cyców, Łęczna, Ludwin, Milejów and Siedliszcze.
