= Józef Franczak =

Polish resistance member

Józef Franczak, codename Lalek
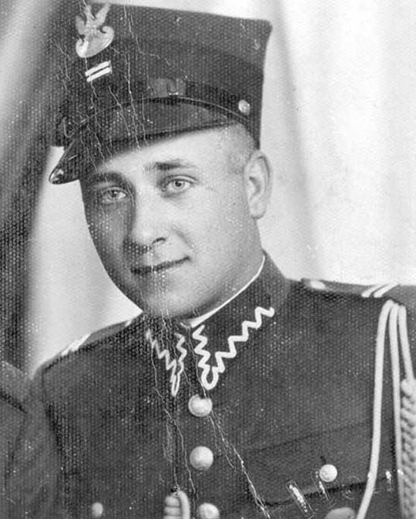
- Józef Franczak as corporal of Military Police in Poland before 1939
- Born: 17 March 1918; Kozice Górne, Kingdom of Poland
- Died: 21 October 1963 (aged 45); Majdan Kozic Górnych, Polish People's Republic
- Cause of death: Gunshot wounds
- Occupations: Sergeant, military police, partisan

Józef Franczak (17 March 1918 – 21 October 1963) was a soldier of the Polish Army, Armia Krajowa World War II resistance, and last of the cursed soldiers – members of the militant anti-communist resistance in Poland. He used codenames Lalek (best known), Laluś, Laleczka, Guściowa, and fake name Józef Babiński. He was a resistance fighter for 24 out of 45 years of his life.

== Biography ==
Józef Franczak was born in the Polish village of Kozice Górne, some 30 km (19 mi) from Lublin. After attending a school for the gendarmerie in Grudziądz, he was stationed as a soldier of the Polish Army in Równe (then in Poland, now Rivne, Ukraine). He was captured during the Soviet invasion of Poland, but escaped and joined one of the first Polish resistance organizations, the Związek Walki Zbrojnej, which later became the Armia Krajowa.

Not much is known about Franczak's wartime activities, except that around February 1943, he and two other partisans (one from the Bataliony Chłopskie) got into a firefight with Jewish partisans in Skrzynice-Kolonia, resulting in two fatalities on the Jewish side. That same year, he was involved in the beating of several villagers who had been described as unfriendly towards the local AK units. Two of these villagers, Adam and Helena Broda, were later honored as Righteous Among the Nations for hiding several Jewish refugees.

In August 1944, Franczak was conscripted into the Polish Second Army. In 1945, having witnessed some of his Home Army colleagues being executed by the communist Polish government at the Uroczysko Baran killing fields, he defected from the Second Army, and hid for a few months in different locations, such as Sopot and Łódź, using the alias of Józef Baginski. Subsequently he returned to the area of Lublin, and joined the militant anti-communist resistance in Poland, colloquially known as the cursed soldiers. His first unit was led by Hieronim Dekutowski (nom de guerre "Zapora"). Captured and arrested by the security forces (Urząd Bezpieczeństwa) in June 1946, he managed to kill four guards and make his escape along with some others.

At the beginning of 1947, he took part in actions against the law enforcement agencies and the military of the communist authorities, particularly the milicja, and the functionaries of the Urząd Bezpieczeństwa and their informers. Later in 1947 he joined a unit led by a Wolność i Niezawisłość officer, Zdzisław Broński (nom de guerre "Uskok"), which operated northeast of Lublin. In 1949 he personally executed a former resistance member who had betrayed Broński. Then for several years he led a group bent on executing traitors and informers, who had joined with those he perceived to be the enemies of Poland.

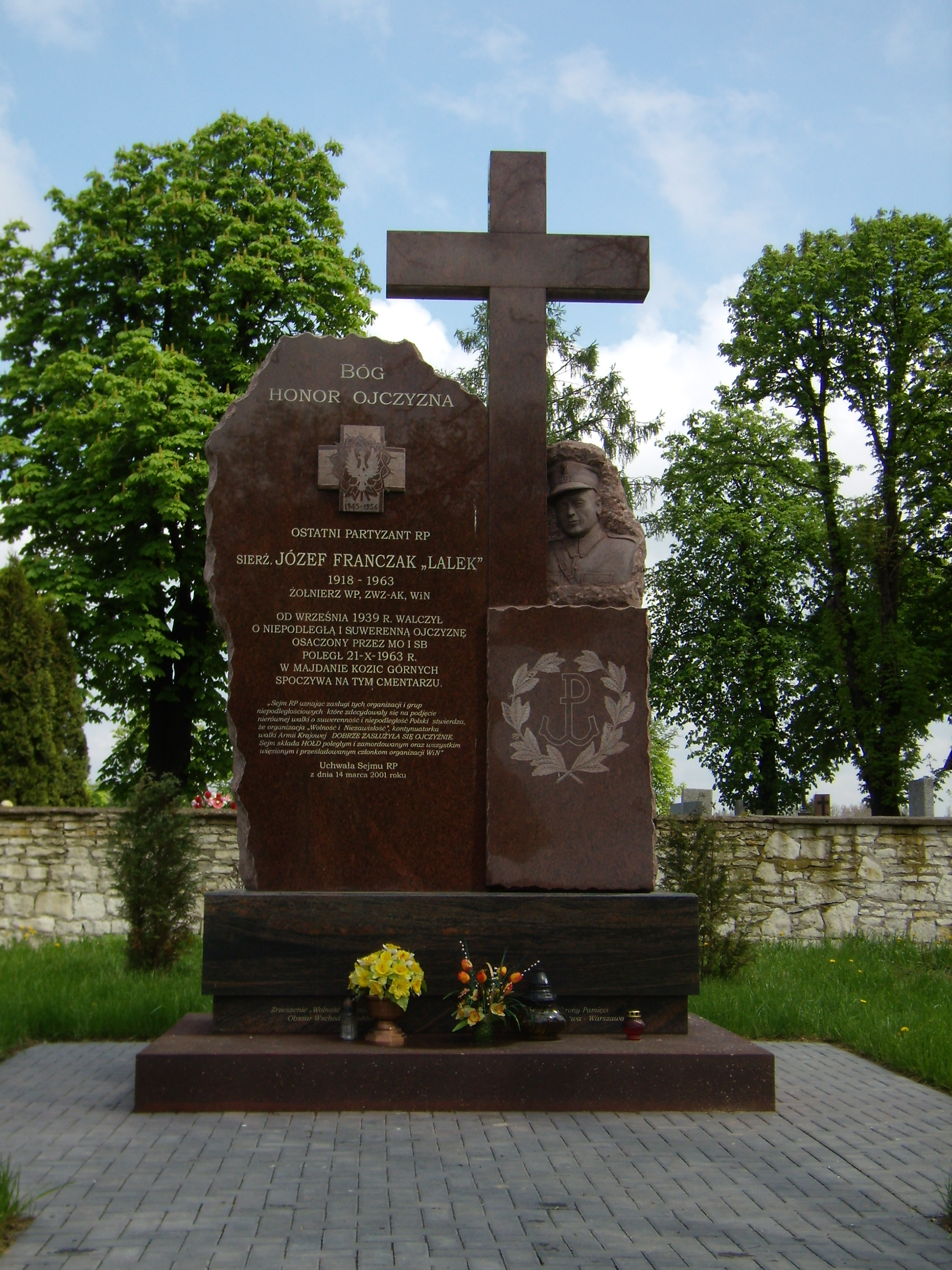
Józef Franczak's monument in Piaski, Poland, 2008

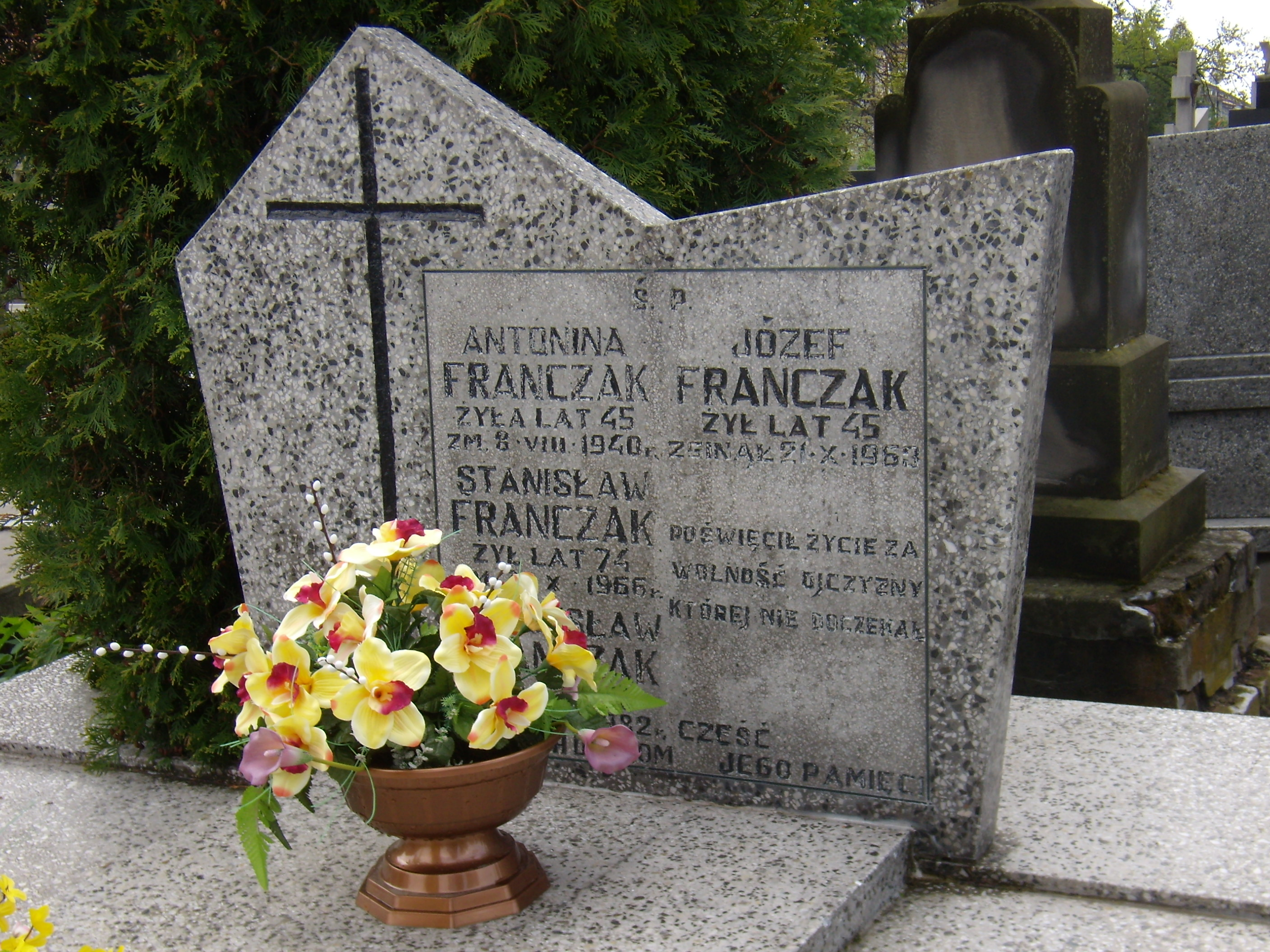
Józef Franczak's grave on cemetery in Piaski, Poland, 2008

Franczak decided not to turn himself to the authorities, an offer tied to the amnesty of 1947 and subsequent amnesties. He was concerned that some real or alleged crimes he committed (in particular, his involvement in the firefight with Jewish partisans in 1943, and his involvement in numerous violent operations against the new government in the post-war years) would not be dismissed under amnesty laws, meaning that Franczak could have faced prosecution upon turning himself in.

In 1948, during a botched bank robbery, his cadre was intercepted by government forces and destroyed; from that time Franczak worked alone, as more and more of his former colleagues were killed, arrested, or simply gave up – especially after the amnesty of April 27, 1956. For the next few years he would be one of the most wanted people in the People's Republic of Poland. He hid near the village of Piaski, and in the area of Krasnystaw, Chełm and the area surrounding Lublin. It has been estimated that some 200 people were involved in giving him various types of aid. Those supporting Franczak exposed themselves to great risk and retribution, since he was regarded as a 'dangerous criminal', by the government. They threatened to punish anyone who helped him with several years of imprisonment.

The Lublin field office of the Polish secret police, the Służba Bezpieczeństwa, had already begun a plan to capture or kill him as early as November 1951, under the codename "Pożar" ("Fire"). In time over 100 different people were involved in the effort to locate and eliminate him. Agents of the SB installed bugs in several houses in the villages around Lublin. In May 1957, the first such device was implanted in the house that belonged to Czeslawa Franczak, Jozef's sister. Soon afterwards, bugs were installed in the house of another sister, Celina Mazur, as well as elsewhere.

Finally, in 1963, he was betrayed by a relative of his mistress, Danuta Mazur. Stanisław Mazur informed the secret police of Franczak's whereabouts and his planned meeting with Danuta, who was also the mother of his child. On 21 October 1963, 35 functionaries of a ZOMO (paramilitary riot police) unit surrounded a barn in Majdan Kozic Górnych, the village where Franczak was in hiding. They demanded his surrender; Franczak presented himself as a local peasant, but after having been asked about identity documents, he opened fire and was mortally wounded in the ensuing firefight.

After an autopsy, Franczak's body (without its head, which was passed to a medical university), was buried in an unmarked grave. His family recovered his remains about twenty years later and reburied them in the cemetery in Piaski Wielkie. His skull was recovered and reburied only in 2014.

== Remembrance ==
In modern Poland, Franczak is considered a hero of the anti-communist resistance. On 17 March 2006, a special event was organized in his honor, with a mass led by the bishop of Lublin, Józef Życiński, and a memorial ceremony attended by the last president of the Polish government-in-exile, Ryszard Kaczorowski, the director of the Institute of National Remembrance, Janusz Kurtyka, and several members of the Polish parliament (Sejm). The Institute also organized a conference about Franczak and anti-communist resistance movements, and the local TV station Telewizja Lublin made a film dedicated to him. All of the events were sponsored by TV Polonia.

In recent years, Franczak has been lionized by the Polish government, with prime minister Mateusz Morawiecki labeling him a "hero" in a 2020 tweet.

== See also ==
- Józef Kuraś
- August Sabbe
- Kalev Arro
- Ion Gavrilă Ogoranu

== Bibliography ==
- (in Polish) Violetta Gut: Józef Franczak ps. Lalek. Ostatni partyzant poakowskiego podziemia, Wydawnictwo Adam Marszałek (Adam Marszałek Publishers), Toruń, 2004, ISBN 83-7322-990-6.
