= Wesołówka =

Wesołówka may refer to the following places in Poland:

- Wesołówka, Lower Silesian Voivodeship (south-west Poland)
- Wesołówka, Łęczna County in Lublin Voivodeship (east Poland)
- Wesołówka, Łuków County in Lublin Voivodeship (east Poland)
- Wesołówka, Świętokrzyskie Voivodeship (south-central Poland)
