= Bronski =

Bronski (also spelled Broński or Bronsky) is a Slavic habitational surname. Notable people with the name include:

- Alina Bronsky (born 1978), Russian-born German writer
- Brick Bronsky (real name Jeffrey Beltzner; 1964–2021), American wrestler and actor
- Michael Bronski (born 1949), American academic and writer
- Mieczysław Broński (1882–1938), Russian-Polish communist
- Steve Bronski (1960–2021), Scottish singer-songwriter
- Zdzisław Broński (1912–1949), reserve officer of the Polish Army

== See also ==
- Bronski Beat, a former British synth-pop band
