= Bogdanka Coal Mine =

Coal mine in Poland

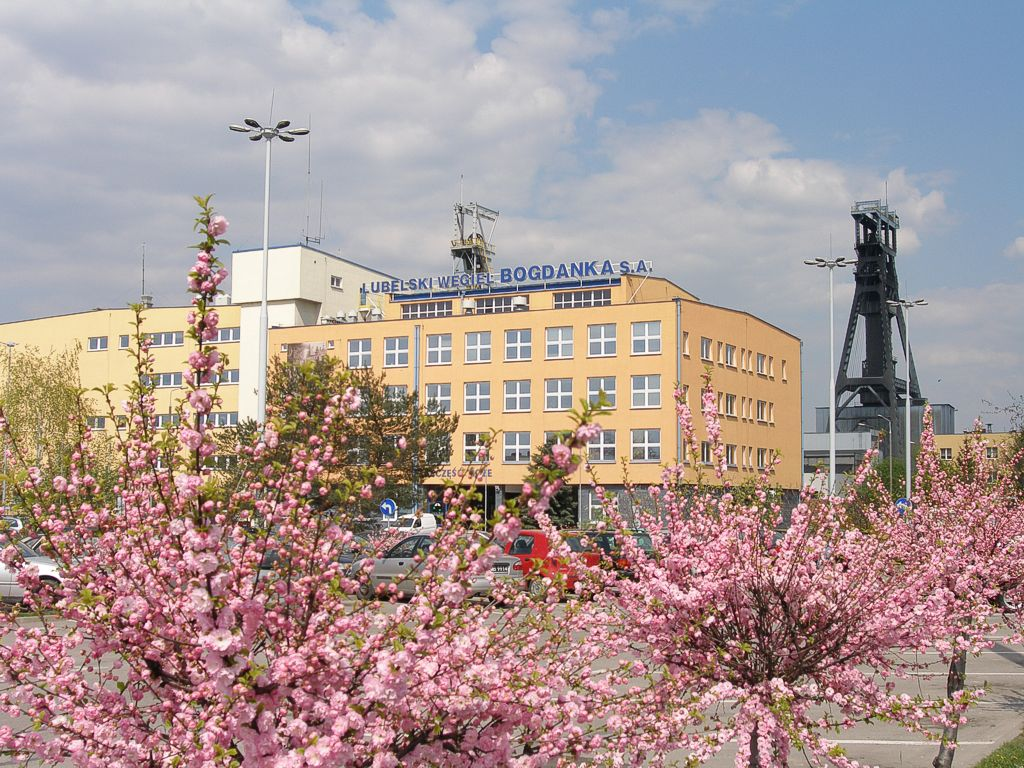

- Location in Poland

Location
- Location: Puchaczów, Lublin Voivodeship, Poland; 51°19′44″N 023°00′17″E

Production
- Products: Coal

History
- Opened: 1975

Owner
- Website: http://www.bogdanka.eu

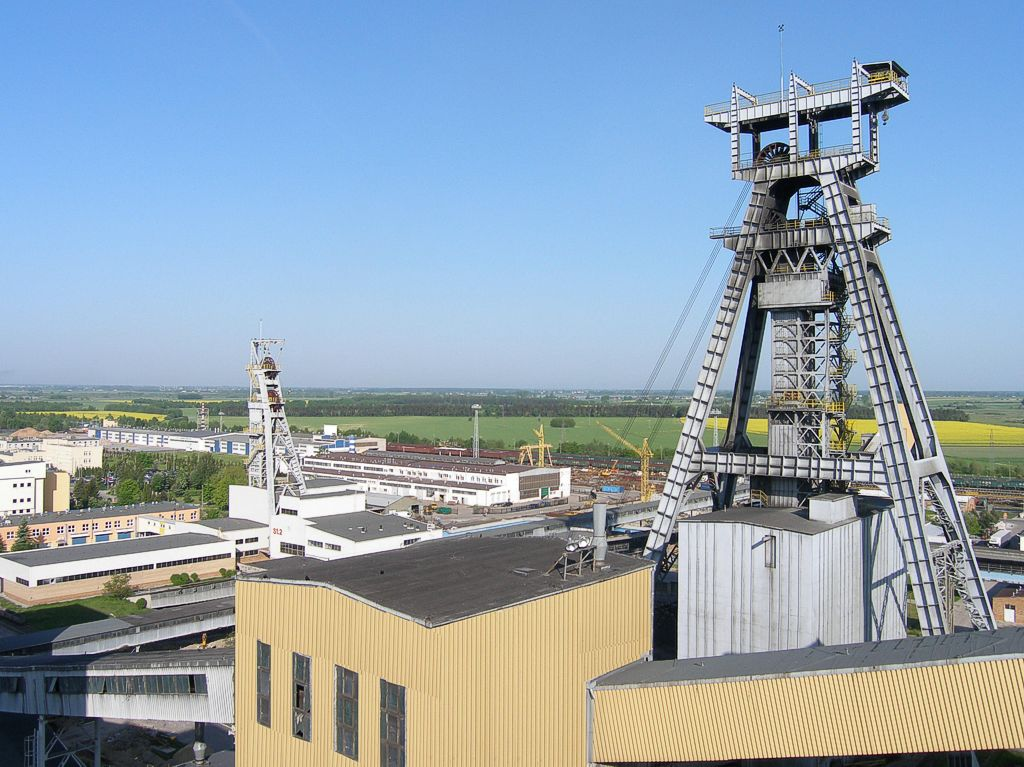
general view of the LW Bogdanka

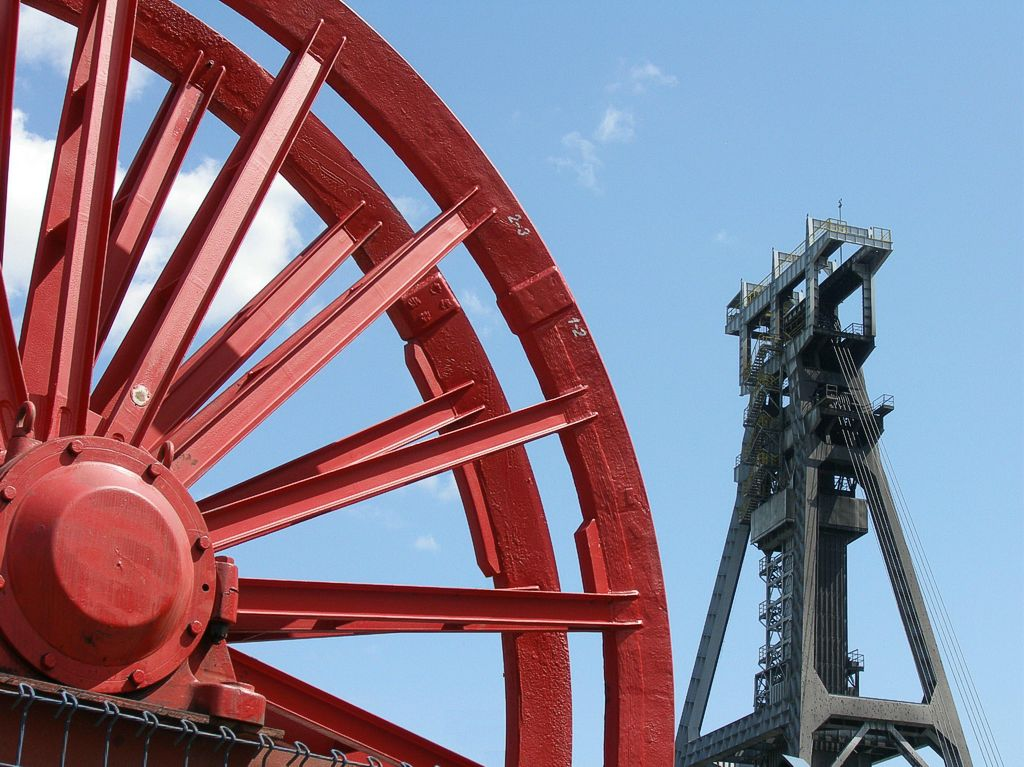
mine shaft in Bogdanka

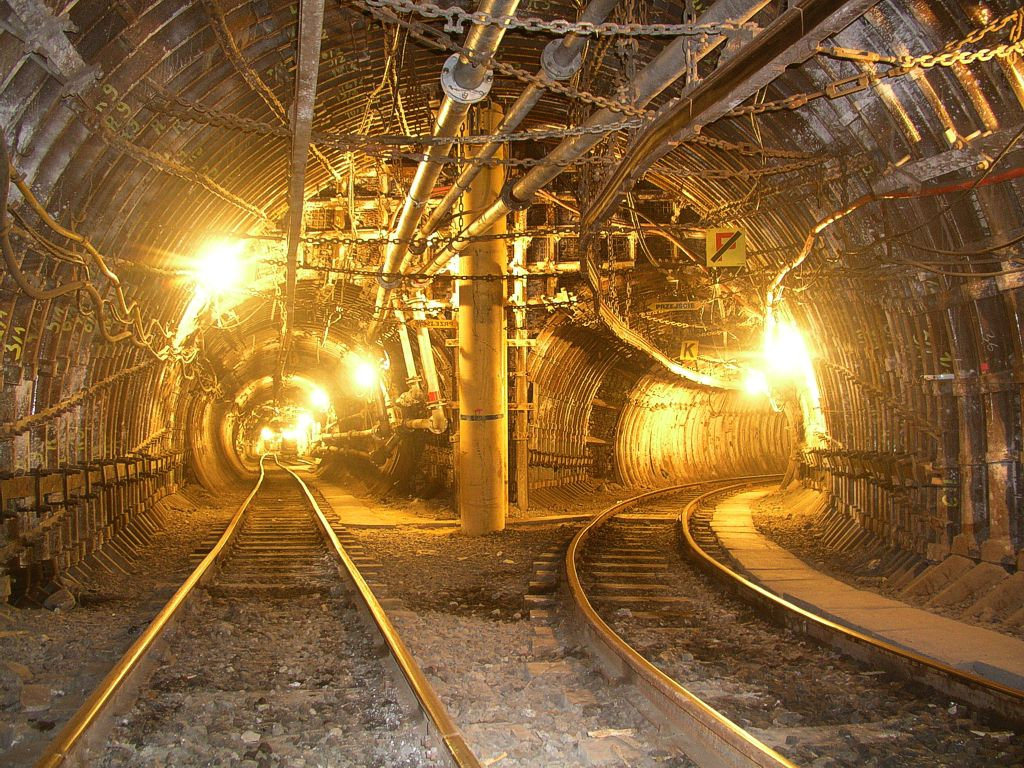
Bogdanka - in the mine

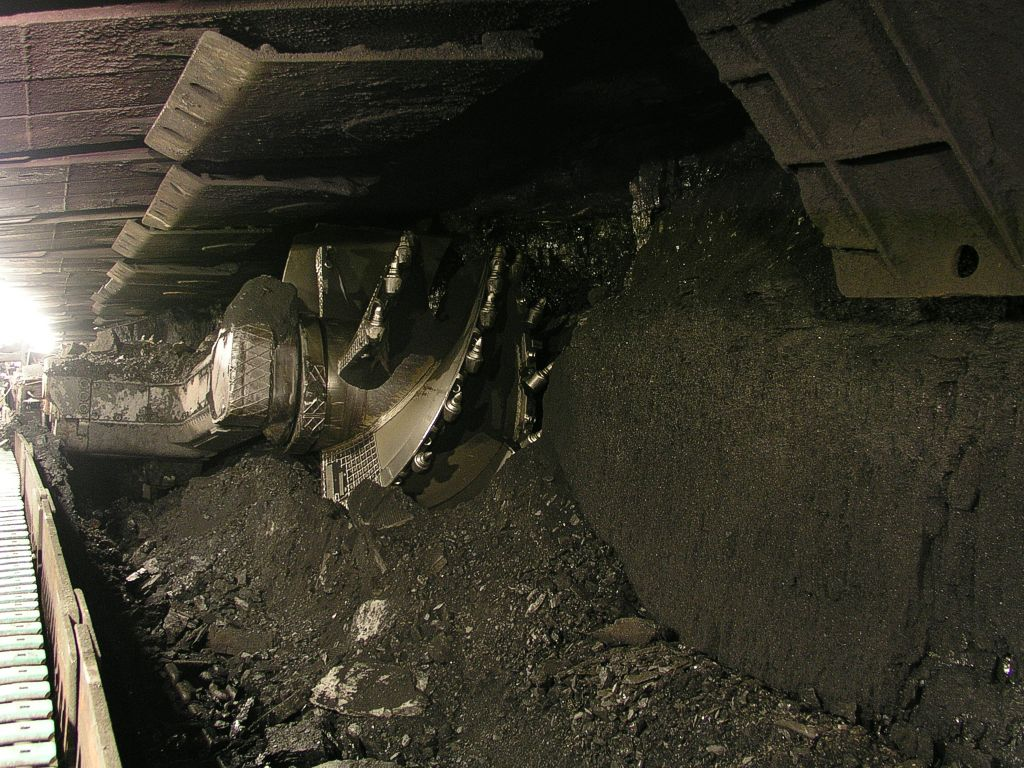
Bogdanka - cutter-loader face

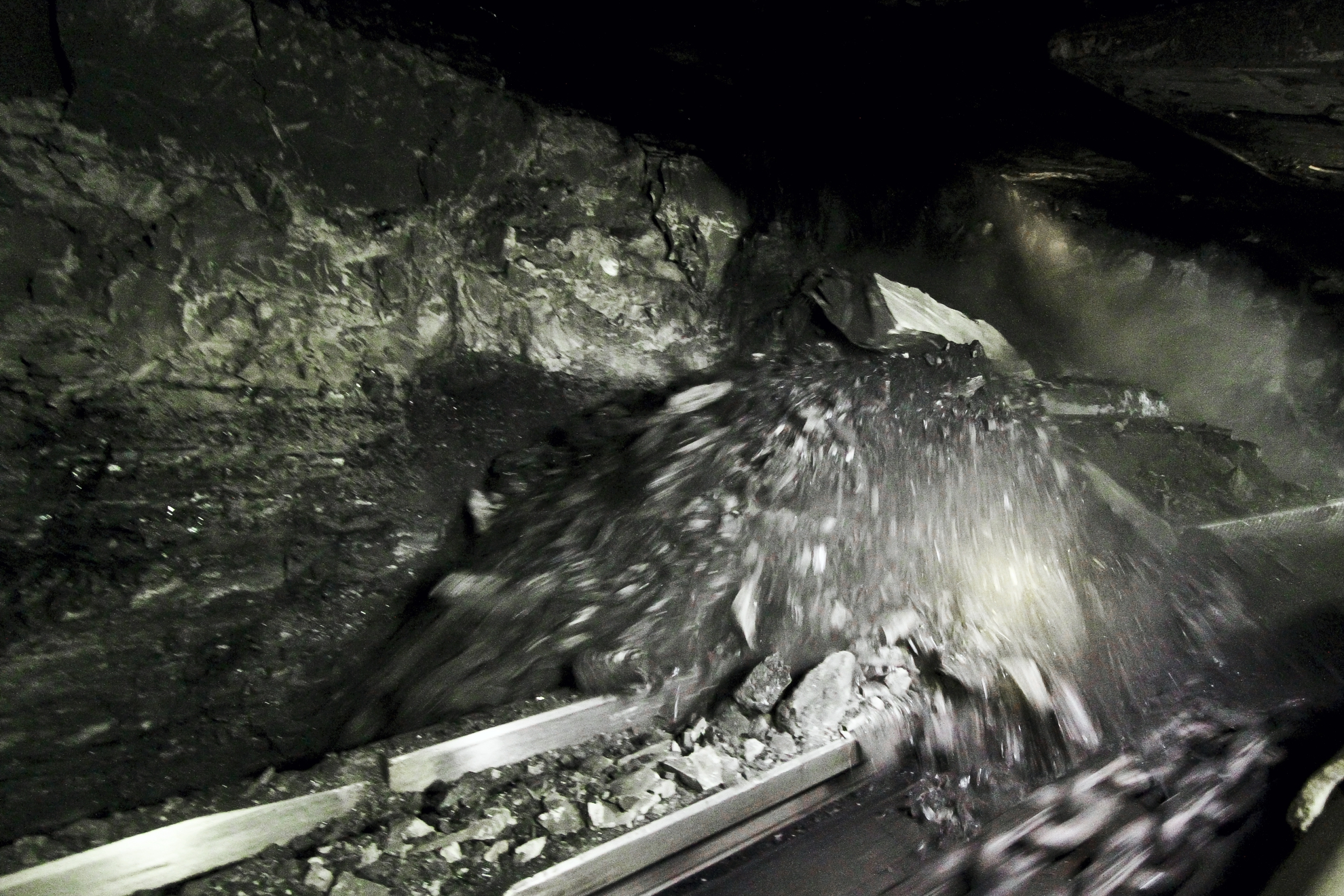
Bogdanka - coal plought

The Bogdanka Coal Mine (Lubelski Węgiel "Bogdanka" S.A.) is a coal mine in the village of Bogdanka near Łęczna, in the vicinity of Lublin, 197 km south-east of Poland's capital, Warsaw, in the Lublin Coal Basin. The mineral-obtaining licence area where extraction takes place is located in the commune of Puchaczów.

In 1975, the first construction of a "pilot" mine in the coal field begun. Today, the mine is known as Lubelski Węgiel Bogdanka S.A. In 2009, the net profit of the mine was PLN 190.84 million, with coal extraction at 5.6 million tonnes. In 2014, the mine reached a net profit of PLN 272.35 million while mining 9.2 million tonnes of coal. Bogdanka is currently the most profitable coal mine in Poland.

== History ==
=== Mineral deposit research ===
The first note about finding coal in the Volhynia area, at a depth of 15 m, was mentioned by W. Choroszewski in Pamiętnik Fizjograficzny (Physiographic Diary) in 1881. Thirty years later, in 1911, a Russian geologist, M. Tetaev, formulated a hypothesis, based on the general knowledge of the geology of this part of Europe, that formations from the Carboniferous period might occur in the west slope of the Ukrainian crystalline massif. The massif was investigated by geologist Prof. J. Samsonowicz, who in 1931 found Carboniferous flint nodules while exploring the area of Pełcza in the west of Volhynia. A year later, he presented his concept of the occurrence of Carboniferous formations, along with their hypothetical distribution, in the western Volhynia and southern Polesie. In the interwar period, prospecting commenced.

In 1938, in Tartaków productive carbon was found at a depth of 239 m, and this date is now considered to mark the beginning of exploration of the Volhynia and Lublin coal basin. Interrupted by World War II, the exploration resumed in the fifties. In 1955, an exploration drill-hole was made in Chełm, where carbon was found at depths from 580 to 1208 m. The drilling (six drill-holes) and geophysical research initiated by Instytut Geologiczny (Polish Geological Institute) led the Centralny Urząd Geologiczny (Central Geological Office) in 1964 to undertake a decision about beginning exploration, research drilling, and prospecting led by the Upper Silesian Branch of the Polish Geological Institute, based in Sosnowiec. In 1965, the first samples of coal were extracted from the Łęczna IG-1 drill-hole. In the years that followed, the Lublin deposit was being described by a team headed by Mgr. inż. J. Porzycki. In January 1975, the Council of Ministers passed Resolution No. 15/75, which gave the go-ahead to the construction of a pilot mine, Kopalnia Pilotująco-Wydobywcza LZW w Bogdance, and under Ordinance No. 4, the Minister of Mining and Energy established a state-owned enterprise, Kopalnie Lubelskiego Zagłębia Węglowego w Budowie.

=== Warsaw Stock Exchange ===
On 25 June 2009, the company's shares were floated on the Warsaw Stock Exchange. The issue brought PLN 528 million to the State Treasury. The next stage of privatisation took place on 9 March 2010. On that day, the Ministry of State Treasury sold on the stock exchange a 46.7% stake in Lubelski Węgiel Bogdanka for over PLN 1.1 billion, with each share priced at PLN 70.50. Following this transaction, the State Treasury was left with a 4.97% stake in the mine. In subsequent years, the State Treasury reduced their participation in the share capital of the Lubelski Węgiel BOGDANKA S.A.

The structure of shareholders of Lubelski Węgiel BOGDANKA S.A. at the end of 1H 2015 is illustrated in the following Table:

Shareholder	Share in the share capital (%)
OFE Aviva BZ WBK	15,1631
OFE PZU Złota Jesień	9,7619
ING OFE	9,6313
Others	65,4437

=== Takeover ===
In the first quarter of 2015, the market situation of Lubelski Węgiel worsened. Coal sales fell by 12.5 percent, its extraction by 11 percent, and net profi– by 47.8 percent, which resulted in announcing plans to cut jobs and investment.

At the end of 2015, electricity holding Enea S.A. (based in Poznań) informed Lubelski Węgiel Bogdanka S.A. that the agreement between one another of the Energa's companies and Bogdanka Mine (supplier), would not be extended. This resulted in about a 40% drop in sales. Later this year Lubelski Węgiel Bogdanka S.A. stakeholders received a call from Enea to sell their shares. The Board of Director considered to rescue company of the hostile takeover. The reason was a number of employees who had been very concerned about their future, and about the future quality of the delivery under new Enea's governance. The cost of operation to the buyer was estimated at around PLN 1.48 B (US$380 M). Bogdanka Coal Mine has been considered the most safe, modern and profitable in Poland. It sets the leading standards for Poland in the field of environmental care and corporate responsibility.

As of June 2016, representatives of new board of directors of "LW Bogdanka/Bogdanka Coal Mine" and "Enea Group", announced cuts in sponsorship to extra class local football club Górnik Łęczna (translated to Łęczna Miner). The club was established by Bogdanka Mine's miners and co-workers in 1979 in Łęczna, the closest town to Bogdanka. The new contract for the whole year of 2016, stated about 20% decrease in subsidy to the sport club. For comparison, the previous year's (2015) subsidy was worth around PLN 5.2M (US$1.35M), and accounted for at most half of the club's yearly budget.

Despite the fact tat Górnik Łęczna is successfully competing in polish extra football league, playing with much larger or wealthier teams, this change has caused the club from Łęczna to search for financial rescue at Lublin Arena in Lublin. Increasing the stadium size, by moving towards the city core's, seamlessly disappointing number of Łęczna-based supporters mainly among Bogdanka Coal Mine miners.

Enea Group, and Bogdanka Coal Mine, are still regarding to "Górnik Łęczna"-involvement, as to component of their CSR process.

== Bogdanka today ==
=== Location ===
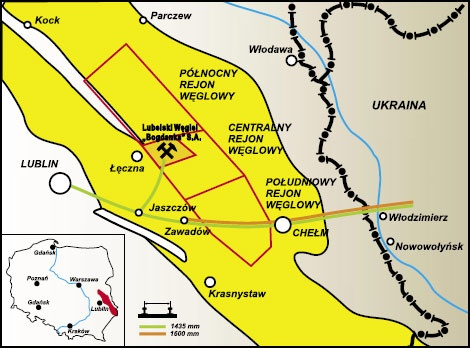
Lubelski Węgiel Bogdanka S.A. is the only coal mine in the Lublin Coal Field. The Bogdanka mine is located in the Central Coal Region, which lies in the north-east of the Lublin Coal Field, being its best explored area. Geographically, the Central Coal Region is part of the Lublin Upland. In administrative terms, the Bogdanka mine is located in the lubelskie voivodship Province, in the commune of Puchaczów.

=== Deposit ===
The extractable coal reserves are approximately 243 million tonnes. It is gas-flame coal. The depth of mining ranges from 860 to 1100 m. The size of the mine's mineral licence area is 73.3 km2.

=== Description ===
Lubelski Węgiel Bogdanka S.A. is one of the leading coal producers in Poland, standing out in the industry in terms of financial performance, productivity, and investment plans to access new deposits. The coal sold by the company is mostly used to produce electricity, heat and cement. The company's customers are mainly industrial companies, especially entities operating in the power industry, located in the east and north-east of Poland.

=== Production ===
As of 2014, LW Bogdanka employed approximately 4,930 people. Daily extraction is approximately 37,000 tonnes.

Annual coal production in the LWB Bogdanka S.A.
	Production ('000 tonne)
2007	5 121
2008	5 576
2009	5 300
2010	5 800
2011	5 838
2012	7 785
2013	8 345
2014	9 191
