= Turowola-Kolonia =

- Village
- Location within Poland
- Coordinates: 51°18′9″N 22°56′53″E
- Country: Poland
- Voivodeship: Lublin
- County: Łęczna
- Gmina: Puchaczów

Turowola-Kolonia [turɔˈvɔla kɔˈlɔɲa] is a village in the administrative district of Gmina Puchaczów, within Łęczna County, Lublin Voivodeship, in eastern Poland.
