= Krzczeń =

- Village
- Location within Poland
- Coordinates: 51°23′N 22°55′E
- Country: Poland
- Voivodeship: Lublin
- County: Łęczna
- Gmina: Ludwin

Krzczeń [kʂt͡ʂɛɲ] is a village in the administrative district of Gmina Ludwin, within Łęczna County, Lublin Voivodeship, in eastern Poland.
