= Dąbrowa, Gmina Ludwin =

Dąbrowa
- Village
- Location within Poland
- Coordinates: 51°21′55″N 22°56′50″E
- Country: Poland
- Voivodeship: Lublin
- County: Łęczna
- Gmina: Ludwin

Dąbrowa [dɔmˈbrɔva] is a village in the administrative district of Gmina Ludwin, within Łęczna County, Lublin Voivodeship, in eastern Poland.
