= Uciekajka =

- Village
- Location within Poland
- Coordinates: 51°22′N 22°59′E
- Country: Poland
- Voivodeship: Lublin
- County: Łęczna
- Gmina: Ludwin

Uciekajka [ut͡ɕɛˈkai̯ka] is a village in the administrative district of Gmina Ludwin, within Łęczna County, Lublin Voivodeship, in eastern Poland.
