= Piaseczno, Lublin Voivodeship =

Piaseczno
- Village
- Location within Poland
- Coordinates: 51°23′59.47″N 23°0′29.62″E
- Country: Poland
- Voivodeship: Lublin
- County: Łęczna
- Gmina: Ludwin
- Time zone: UTC+1 (CET)
  - Summer (DST): UTC+2 (CEST)

Piaseczno [pjaˈsɛt͡ʂnɔ] is a village in the administrative district of Gmina Ludwin, within Łęczna County, Lublin Voivodeship, in eastern Poland.

== History ==
16 Polish citizens were murdered by Nazi Germany in the village during World War II.
