= Szpica =

- Village
- Location within Poland
- Coordinates: 51°16′N 23°0′E
- Country: Poland
- Voivodeship: Lublin
- County: Łęczna
- Gmina: Puchaczów

Szpica [ˈʂpit͡sa] is a village in the administrative district of Gmina Puchaczów, within Łęczna County, Lublin Voivodeship, in eastern Poland.
