= Nadrybie Ukazowe =

- Village
- Location within Poland
- Coordinates: 51°19′33″N 23°02′06″E
- Country: Poland
- Voivodeship: Lublin
- County: Łęczna
- Gmina: Puchaczów

Nadrybie Ukazowe [naˈdrɨbjɛ ukaˈzɔvɛ] is a village in the administrative district of Gmina Puchaczów, within Łęczna County, Lublin Voivodeship, in eastern Poland.
