= Zezulin Pierwszy =

- Village
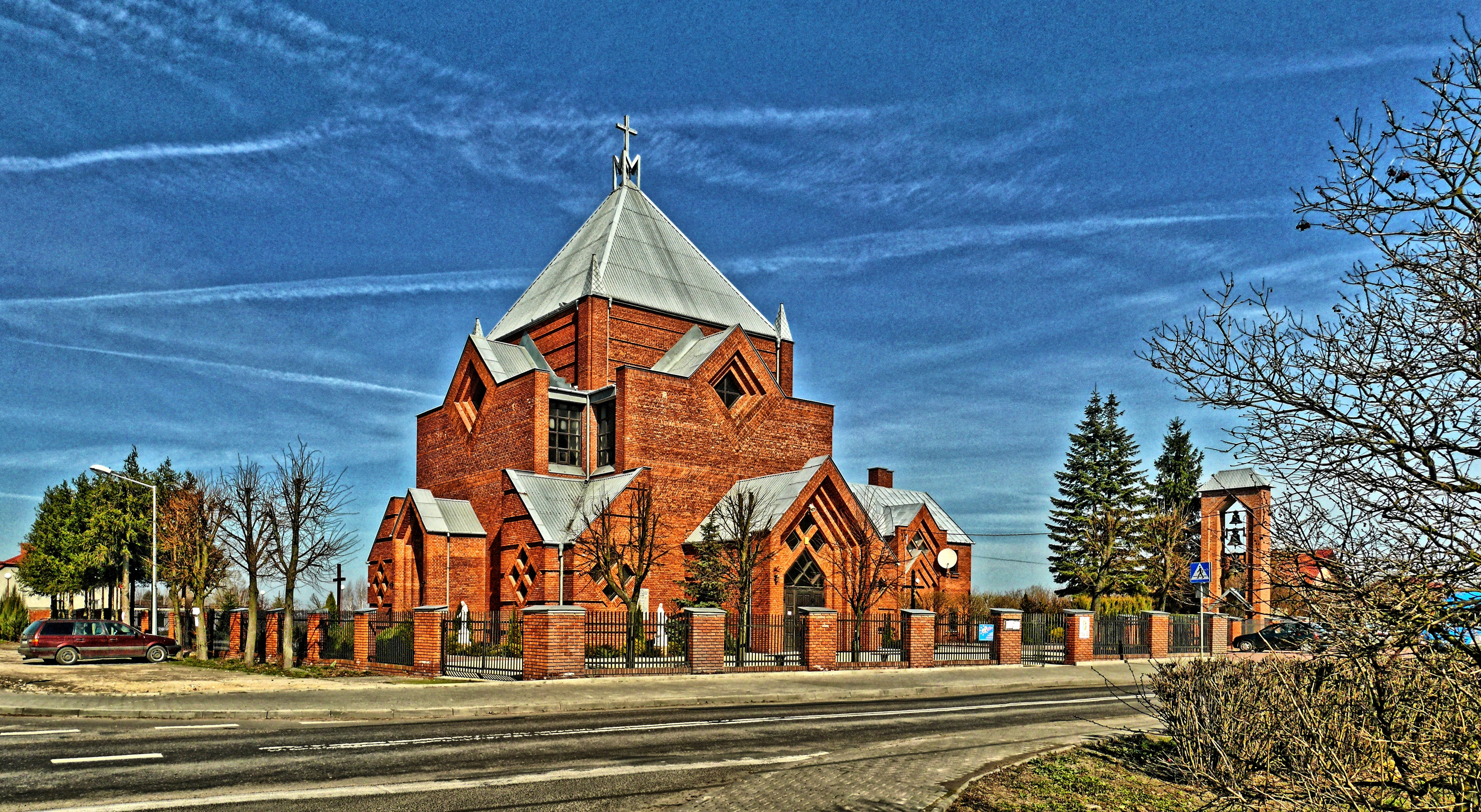

- Location within Poland
- Coordinates: 51°21′N 22°51′E
- Country: Poland
- Voivodeship: Lublin
- County: Łęczna
- Gmina: Ludwin
- Elevation: 174 m (571 ft)
- Population: 341

Zezulin Pierwszy [zɛˈzulin ˈpjɛrfʂɨ] is a village in the administrative district of Gmina Ludwin, within Łęczna County, Lublin Voivodeship, in eastern Poland.
