= Dratów-Kolonia =

- Village
- Location within Poland
- Coordinates: 51°22′58″N 22°55′35″E
- Country: Poland
- Voivodeship: Lublin
- County: Łęczna
- Gmina: Ludwin

Dratów-Kolonia [ˈdratuf kɔˈlɔɲa] is a village in the administrative district of Gmina Ludwin, within Łęczna County, Lublin Voivodeship, in eastern Poland.
