= Jagodno, Lublin Voivodeship =

Jagodno
- Village
- Location within Poland
- Coordinates: 51°24′24″N 23°02′38″E
- Country: Poland
- Voivodeship: Lublin
- County: Łęczna
- Gmina: Ludwin

Jagodno [jaˈɡɔdnɔ] is a village in the administrative district of Gmina Ludwin, within Łęczna County, Lublin Voivodeship, in eastern Poland.
