= Jasieniec, Lublin Voivodeship =

Jasieniec
- Village
- Location within Poland
- Coordinates: 51°16′N 23°4′E
- Country: Poland
- Voivodeship: Lublin
- County: Łęczna
- Gmina: Puchaczów

Jasieniec [jaˈɕɛɲɛt͡s] is a village in the administrative district of Gmina Puchaczów, within Łęczna County, Lublin Voivodeship, in eastern Poland.
