= Ostrówek, Łęczna County =

Ostrówek
- Village
- Location within Poland
- Coordinates: 51°16′00″N 22°59′03″E
- Country: Poland
- Voivodeship: Lublin
- County: Łęczna
- Gmina: Puchaczów
- Time zone: UTC+1 (CET)
  - Summer (DST): UTC+2 (CEST)
- Vehicle registration: LLE

Ostrówek [ɔsˈtruvɛk] is a village in the administrative district of Gmina Puchaczów, within Łęczna County, Lublin Voivodeship, in eastern Poland.

== History ==
Following the German-Soviet invasion of Poland, which started World War II in September 1939, the village was occupied by Germany until 1944. The village was the site of two massacres of Poles committed by the German occupiers and Ukrainian auxiliaries on 19 August 1942 and 9 April 1944. The first claimed seven victims, men aged 28 to 55, whereas the second claimed 24 victims, men, women and children, including infants aged 1.5, 2 and 3.
