= Czarny Las, Lublin Voivodeship =

Czarny Las
- Village
- Location within Poland
- Coordinates: 51°23′22.48″N 23°4′7.06″E
- Country: Poland
- Voivodeship: Lublin
- County: Łęczna
- Gmina: Ludwin

Czarny Las [ˈt͡ʂarnɨ ˈlas] is a village in the administrative district of Gmina Ludwin, within Łęczna County, Lublin Voivodeship, in eastern Poland.
