= Kocia Góra =

- Village
- Location within Poland
- Coordinates: 51°23′N 22°52′E
- Country: Poland
- Voivodeship: Lublin
- County: Łęczna
- Gmina: Ludwin

Kocia Góra [ˈkɔt͡ɕa ˈɡura] is a village in the administrative district of Gmina Ludwin, within Łęczna County, Lublin Voivodeship, in eastern Poland.
