= Zezulin Niższy =

- Village
- Location within Poland
- Coordinates: 51°21′28″N 22°50′18″E
- Country: Poland
- Voivodeship: Lublin
- County: Łęczna
- Gmina: Ludwin

Zezulin Niższy [zɛˈzulin ˈniʂʂɨ] is a village in the administrative district of Gmina Ludwin, within Łęczna County, Lublin Voivodeship, in eastern Poland.
