= Kaniwola =

- Village
- Location within Poland
- Coordinates: 51°21′50″N 23°1′45″E
- Country: Poland
- Voivodeship: Lublin
- County: Łęczna
- Gmina: Ludwin

Kaniwola [kaniˈvɔla] is a village in the administrative district of Gmina Ludwin, within Łęczna County, Lublin Voivodeship, in eastern Poland.
