= Rozpłucie Drugie =

- Village
- Location within Poland
- Coordinates: 51°24′32″N 23°00′40″E
- Country: Poland
- Voivodeship: Lublin
- County: Łęczna
- Gmina: Ludwin

Rozpłucie Drugie [rɔsˈpwut͡ɕɛ ˈdruɡʲɛ] is a village in the administrative district of Gmina Ludwin, within Łęczna County, Lublin Voivodeship, in eastern Poland.
