= Ludwin =

- Village
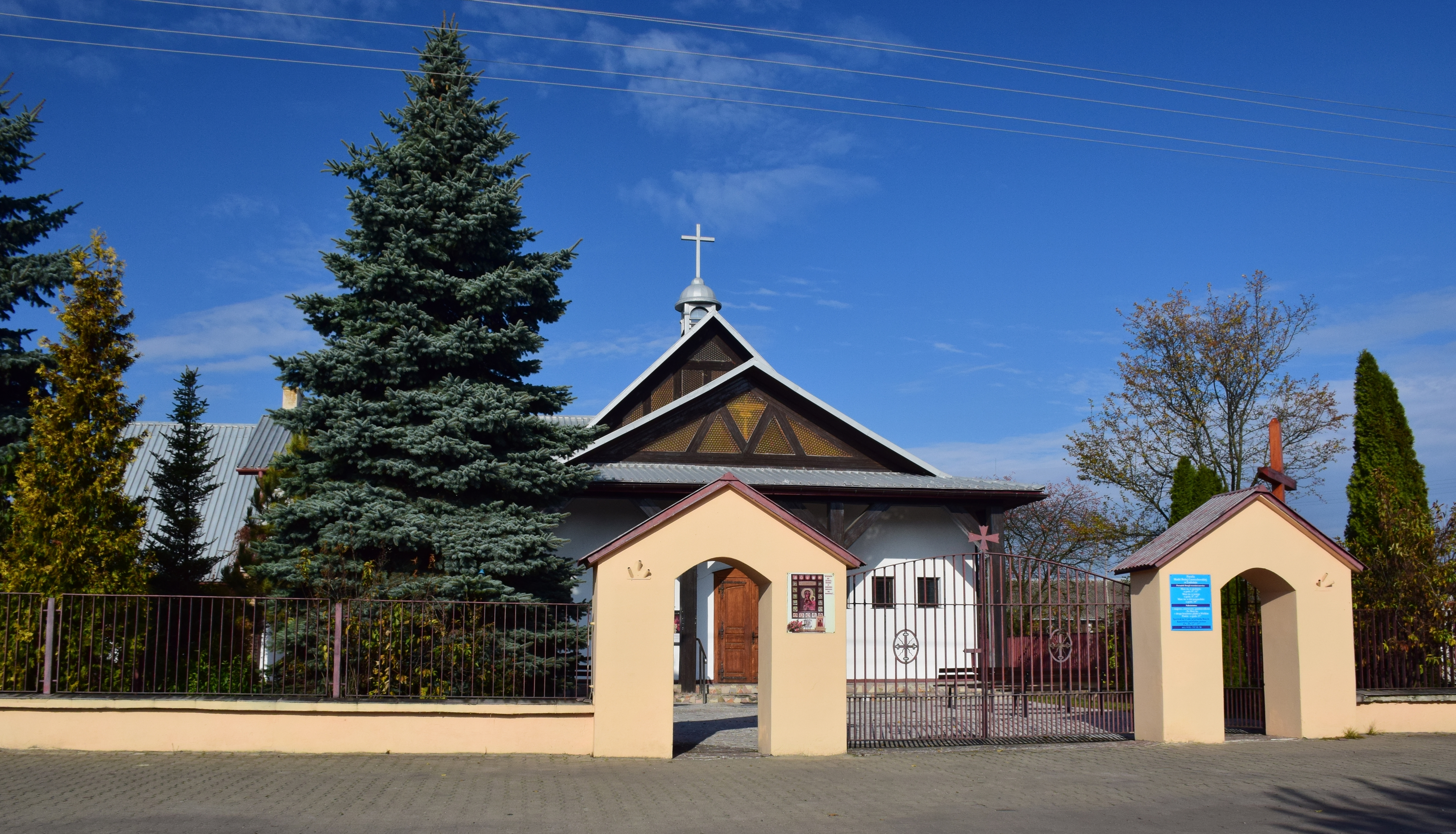
- Church of Our Lady of Częstochowa

- Flag Coat of arms

- Location within Poland
- Coordinates: 51°20′N 22°54′E
- Country: Poland
- Voivodeship: Lublin
- County: Łęczna
- Gmina: Ludwin

Population
  - Total: 5,041
- Website: http://www.ludwin.lubelskie.pl

Ludwin [ˈludvin] is a village in Łęczna County, Lublin Voivodeship, in eastern Poland. It is the seat of the gmina (administrative district) called Gmina Ludwin.

The area includes several distinct colonies. It is recognized as an official part of Lublin Agglomeration, also as a gate to the Pojezierze Kameralne (Lakeland District).
