= Ciechanki =

- Village
- Location within Poland
- Coordinates: 51°17′N 22°57′E
- Country: Poland
- Voivodeship: Lublin
- County: Łęczna
- Gmina: Puchaczów

Ciechanki [t͡ɕɛˈxanki] is a village in the administrative district of Gmina Puchaczów, within Łęczna County, Lublin Voivodeship, in eastern Poland.
