= Majdan Kozic Górnych =

- Village
- Location within Poland
- Coordinates: 51°6′N 22°44′E
- Country: Poland
- Voivodeship: Lublin
- County: Świdnik
- Gmina: Piaski
- Time zone: UTC+1 (CET)
  - Summer (DST): UTC+2 (CEST)

Majdan Kozic Górnych (Polish pronunciation: [ˈmajdaŋ ˈkɔʑidz ˈɡurnɨx]) is a village in the administrative district of Gmina Piaski, within Świdnik County, Lublin Voivodeship, in eastern Poland.

== History ==
Four Polish citizens were murdered by Nazi Germany in the village during World War II.

Last cursed soldier Józef Franczak was killed in a firefight in the village.
