= Zawadów, Lublin Voivodeship =

Zawadów
- Village
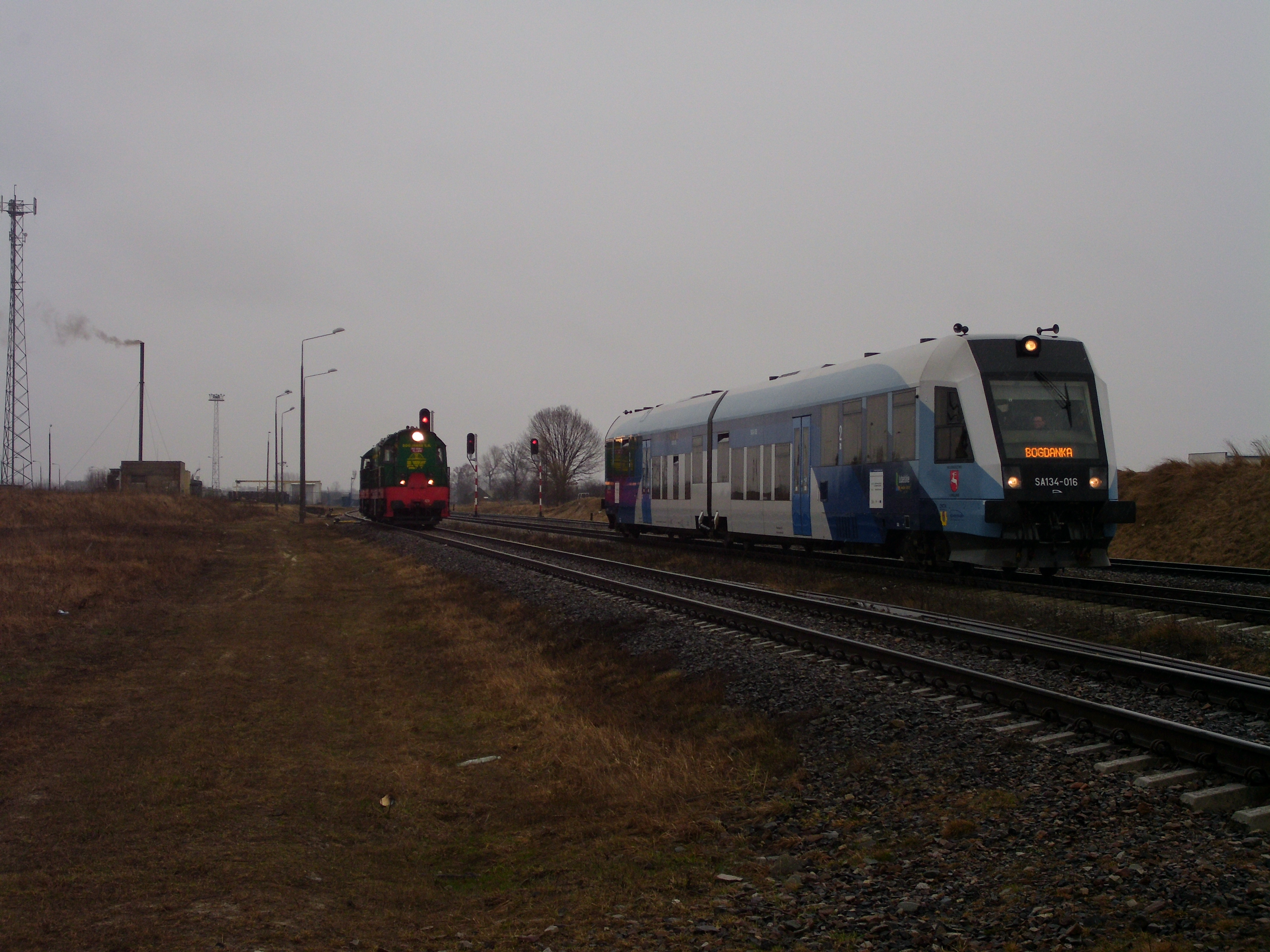
- Zawadów railway station

- Location within Poland
- Coordinates: 51°14′N 23°3′E
- Country: Poland
- Voivodeship: Lublin
- County: Łęczna
- Gmina: Puchaczów
- Time zone: UTC+1 (CET)
  - Summer (DST): UTC+2 (CEST)
- Vehicle registration: LLE

Zawadów [zaˈvaduf] is a village in the administrative district of Gmina Puchaczów, within Łęczna County, Lublin Voivodeship, in eastern Poland.

== History ==
According to the 1921 Polish census, the village had population of 332, exclusively 99.2% Polish by nationality.

Following the German-Soviet invasion of Poland, which started World War II in September 1939, the village was occupied by Germany until 1944. In March 1944, the German occupiers and Ukrainian auxiliaries committed a massacre of six people: three Poles, two Russian prisoners-of-war and one Jew.
