= Rogóźno, Łęczna County =

Rogóźno
- Village
- Location within Poland
- Coordinates: 51°23′12″N 22°58′12″E
- Country: Poland
- Voivodeship: Lublin
- County: Łęczna
- Gmina: Ludwin

Rogóźno [rɔˈɡuʑnɔ] is a village in the administrative district of Gmina Ludwin, within Łęczna County, Lublin Voivodeship, in eastern Poland.
