= Zavadiv =

Zavadiv (Ukrainian: Завадів, Polish: Zawadów, Russian: Завадов, Zavadov) derives from the word zavada/zawada which literally means "obstacle" in several Slavic languages. It may refer to several places in Lviv Oblast, Ukraine:

- Zavadiv, Lviv Raion, Lviv Oblast, village in Lviv Raion
- Zavadiv, Mostyska urban hromada, Yavoriv Raion, Lviv Oblast, village in Mostyska urban hromada, Yavoriv Raion
- Zavadiv, Stryi Raion, Lviv Oblast, village in Stryi Raion
- Zavadiv, Yavoriv urban hromada, Yavoriv Raion, Lviv Oblast, village in Yavoriv urban hromada, Yavoriv Raion
