= Wesołówka, Łęczna County =

Wesołówka
- Village
- Location within Poland
- Coordinates: 51°17′35″N 23°01′16″E
- Country: Poland
- Voivodeship: Lublin
- County: Łęczna
- Gmina: Puchaczów

Wesołówka [vɛsɔˈwufka] is a village in the administrative district of Gmina Puchaczów, within Łęczna County, Lublin Voivodeship, in eastern Poland.
