= Łęczna Lake District Landscape Park =

Protected area in Poland

Coordinates: 51.5189°N 22.9539°E

- Park Krajobrazowy Pojezierze Łęczyńskie
- IUCN category V (protected landscape/seascape)
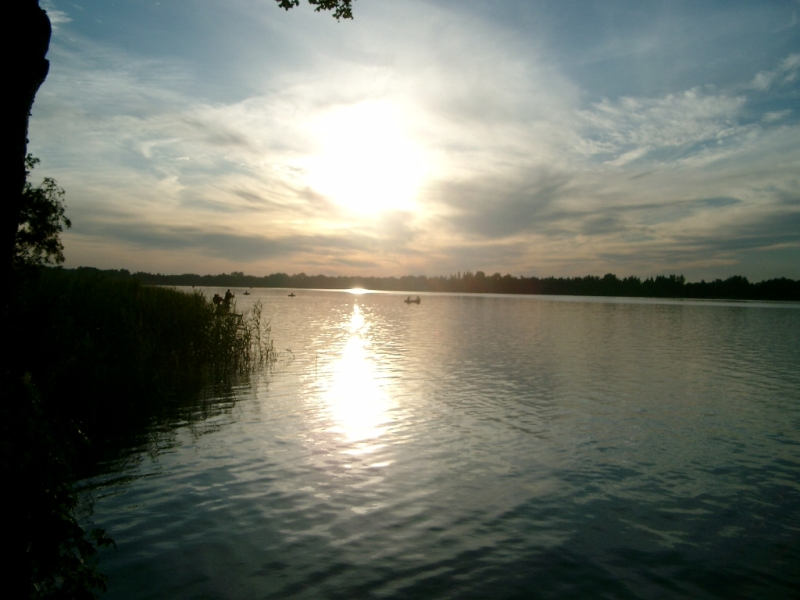
- Lake Białe in the Łęczna-Włodawa Lakeland (Pojezierze Łęczyńsko-Włodawskie)
- Interactive map of Łęczna Lake District Landscape Park
- Location: Lublin Voivodeship
- Area: 118.16 km^{2} (45.62 sq mi)
- Established: 1990

Łęczna Lake District Landscape Park or Łęczna Lakeland Scenic Park (Polish: Park Krajobrazowy Pojezierze Łęczyńskie) is a protected area (a Landscape Park) in eastern Poland, established in 1990, covering an area of 118.16 square kilometres (45.62 sq mi) in the geographic region called the Łęczna-Włodawa Lakeland (Pojezierze Łęczyńsko-Włodawskie) or the Łęczna-Włodawa Plain (Równina Łęczyńsko-Włodawska).

The Park lies within Lublin Voivodeship: in Lubartów County (Gmina Ostrów Lubelski, Gmina Uścimów) and Łęczna County (Gmina Ludwin, Gmina Puchaczów).

The best known recreational area within the Łęczna Lakeland surrounds the White lake (Jezioro Białe Włodawskie), with the resort town called Okuninka.

== See also ==
- Special Protection Areas in Poland
