= Stary Radzic =

- Village
- Location within Poland
- Coordinates: 51°22′22″N 22°49′25″E
- Country: Poland
- Voivodeship: Lublin
- County: Łęczna
- Gmina: Ludwin

Stary Radzic [ˈstarɨ ˈrad͡ʑit͡s] is a village in the administrative district of Gmina Ludwin, within Łęczna County, Lublin Voivodeship, in eastern Poland.
