= Bogdanka, Lublin Voivodeship =

Bogdanka
- Village
- Location within Poland
- Coordinates: 51°20′N 23°1′E
- Country: Poland
- Voivodeship: Lublin
- County: Łęczna
- Gmina: Puchaczów

Bogdanka [bɔɡˈdaŋka] is a village in the administrative district of Gmina Puchaczów, within Łęczna County, Lublin Voivodeship, in eastern Poland.
