= Puchaczów =

- Village
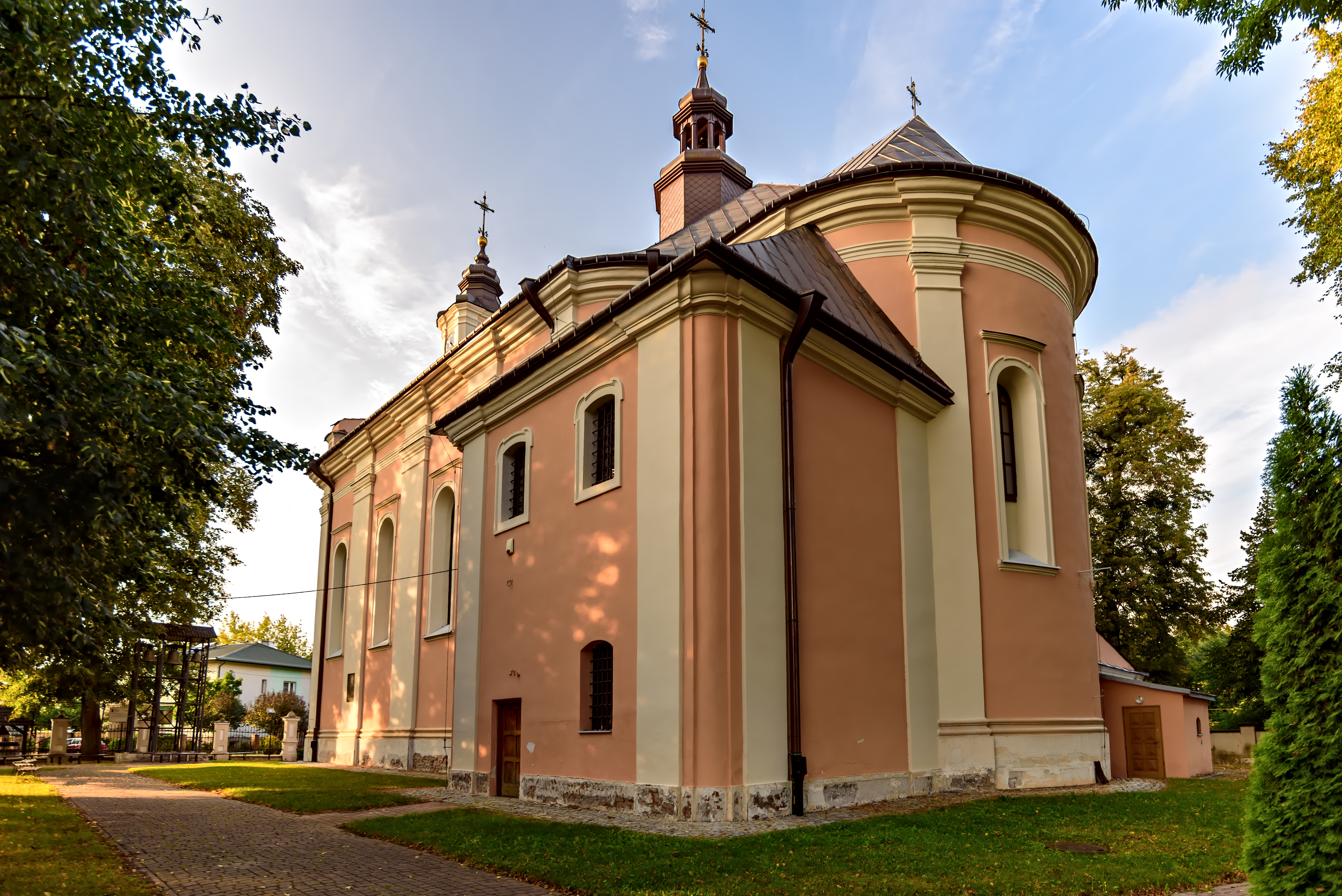
- Church of the Assumption in Puchaczów

- Location within Poland
- Coordinates: 51°18′N 22°58′E
- Country: Poland
- Voivodeship: Lublin
- County: Łęczna
- Gmina: Puchaczów
- Time zone: UTC+1 (CET)
  - Summer (DST): UTC+2 (CEST)

Puchaczów [puˈxat͡ʂuf] is a village in Łęczna County, Lublin Voivodeship, in eastern Poland. It is the seat of the gmina (administrative district) called Gmina Puchaczów.

== History ==
14 Polish citizens were murdered by Nazi Germany in the village during World War II.
