= Łęczna =

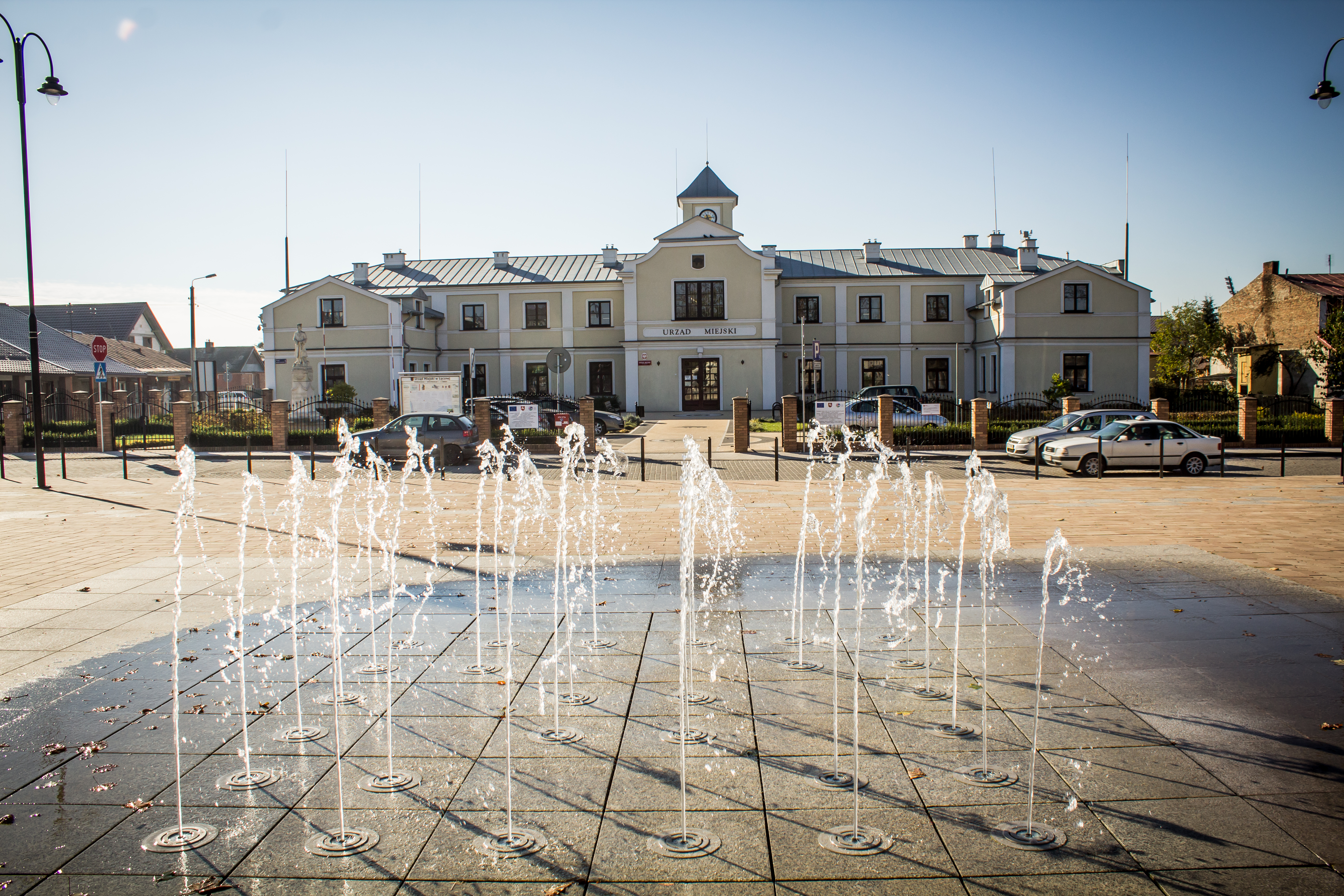
- Łęczna town hall

- Flag Coat of arms

- Location within Poland
- Coordinates: 51°18′N 22°53′E
- Country: Poland
- Voivodeship: Lublin
- County: Łęczna
- Gmina: Łęczna
- Town rights: 1467

Government
  - Mayor: Leszek Włodarski (Ind.)

Area
  - Total: 11.00 km^{2} (4.25 sq mi)

Population (2017)
  - Total: 18 812
  - Density: 1.6/km^{2} (4.2/sq mi)
- Time zone: UTC+1 (CET)
  - Summer (DST): UTC+2 (CEST)
- Postal code: 21-010
- Car plates: LLE
- Primary airport: Lublin Airport
- Website: www.leczna.pl

Łęczna [ˈwɛnt͡ʂna] is a town in eastern Poland with 19,780 inhabitants (2014), situated in Lublin Voivodeship. It is the seat of Łęczna County and the smaller administrative district of Gmina Łęczna. The town is located in northeastern corner of historic province of Lesser Poland. Łęczna tops among the hills of the Lublin Upland, at the confluence of two rivers—the Wieprz, and the Świnka. On December 31, 2010, the population of the town was 20,706. Łęczna does not have a rail station, the town has been placed on a national Route 82 from Lublin to Włodawa. And shall be considered as a start point to Kameralne Pojezierze, as the town has decided to rebrand the lakeland district, from Pojezierze Łęczyńsko-Włodawskie, or Pojezierze Łęczyńskie, to Kameralne Pojezierze.

== History ==
=== Middle Ages ===
First documented mention of the village of Łęczna comes from the year 1252. At that time, the area east of Lublin (eastern borderlands of Lesser Poland) was sparsely populated, without any towns and with few villages, as the region was frequently raided by the Mongols, Tatars, Lithuanians, Yotvingians and East Slavs. This changed in the late 14th century, after the Union of Krewo (1385), when the Polish–Lithuanian Union was established between the Kingdom of Poland and the Grand Duchy of Lithuania. In 1462, a local nobleman (see szlachta), Zbigniew z Łęcznej, sold the village to the Tęczyński family. Five years later, on January 7, 1467, Jan of Tęczyn, the castellan of Kraków, received the Magdeburg town rights for the town of Łęczna (named after the village), on the Wieprz river. King Casimir IV Jagiellon issued the document in Kozienice, and Łęczna was strategically located on a hill, 175 m (574 ft) above sea level. Its first residents came from other town and villages of the region. It was located within the Lublin Voivodeship in the Lesser Poland Province of the Kingdom of Poland.

=== Early modern era ===
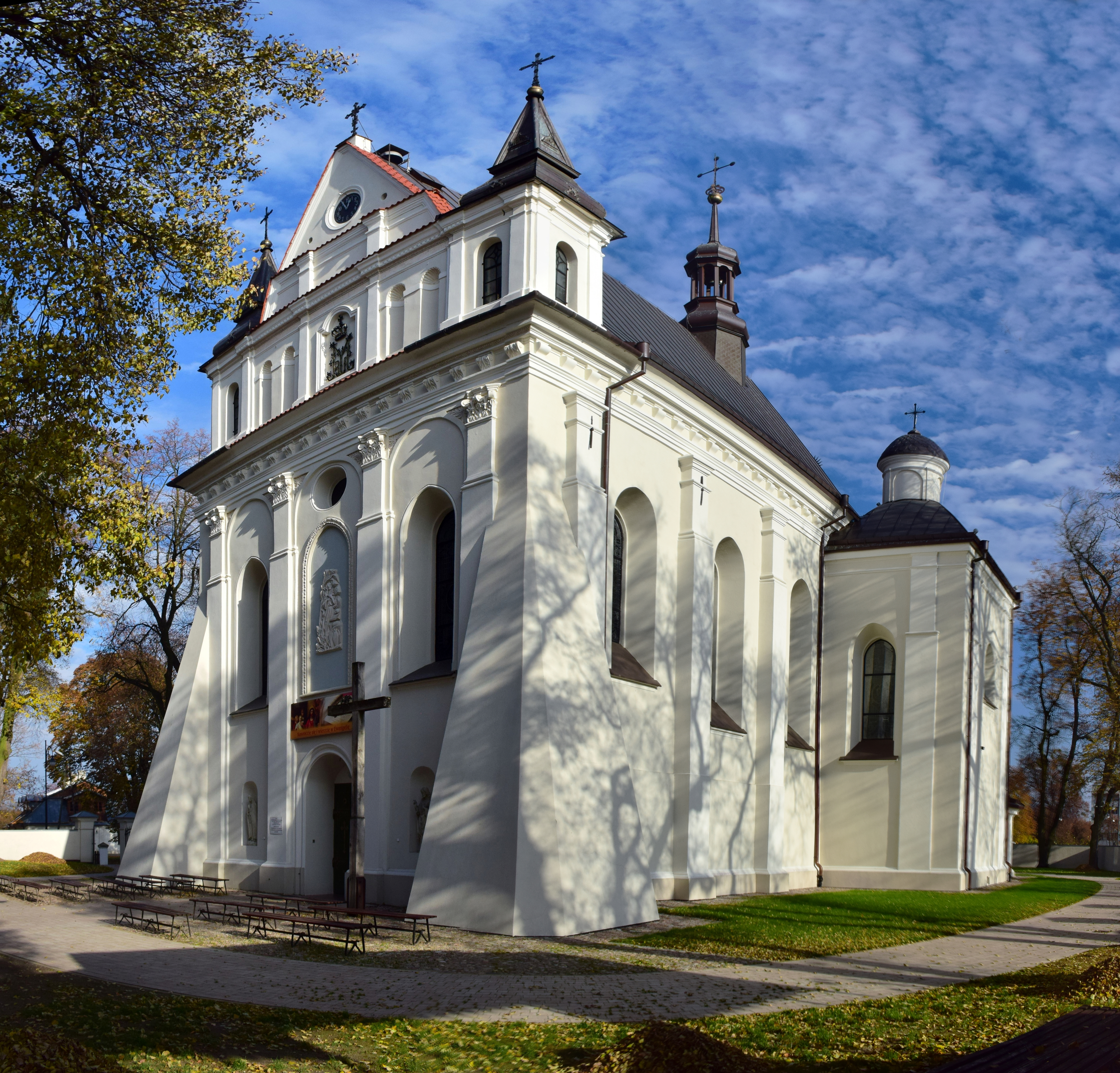
Renaissance St. Mary Magdalene Church

Thanks to trade privileges granted by King Stephen Báthory in 1581, the town became one of the most important centres for trading horses and cattle in Poland. Merchants from both the Polish–Lithuanian Commonwealth and abroad came here, and in the early 16th century, first Jewish settlers came to Łęczna. The town, located on a busy merchant route towards Volhynia and Lithuania, quickly developed, despite Tatar raids (late 15th and early 16th centuries), and several fires (1525, 1552, 1564, 1569). The Polish Golden Age and the first half of the 17th century were the period of prosperity of the town. Łęczna was in private hands, with a castle, a town hall, tenement houses, churches and a synagogue.

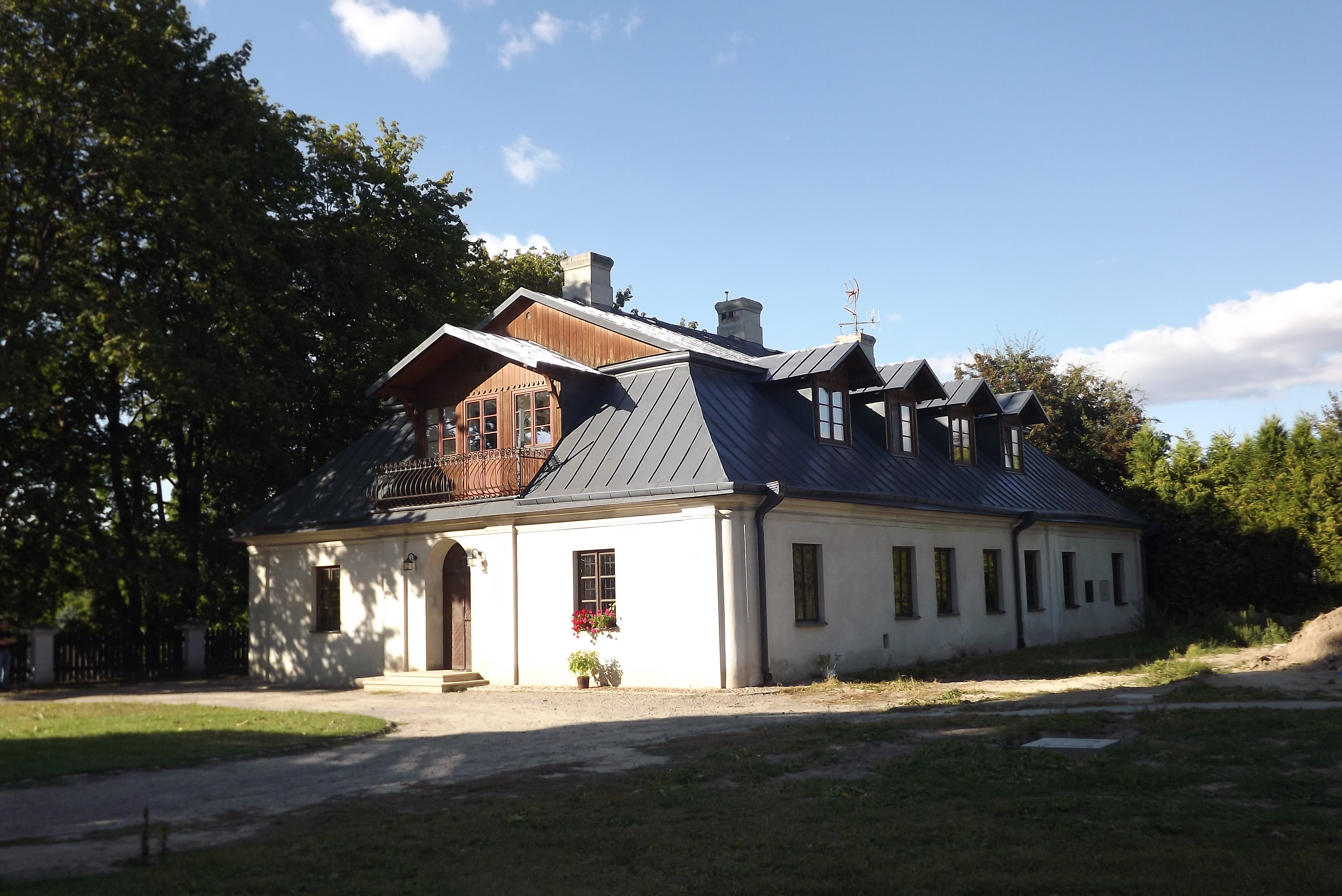
A historic Baroque rectory in Łęczna

This ended in the mid-17th century, when in the Swedish invasion of Poland and other wars, Łęczna was destroyed several times. In 1693 almost all residents died in an epidemic, and 1710, the population was decimated by the plague. In the mid-18th century, the town burned in two fires (1746, 1761), and in the 1760s, Łęczna belonged to Bishop of Płock, Hieronim Szeptycki. In 1778, the 4th Infantry Regiment of the Polish Crown Army was garrisoned in Łęczna.

=== Late modern era and recent times ===
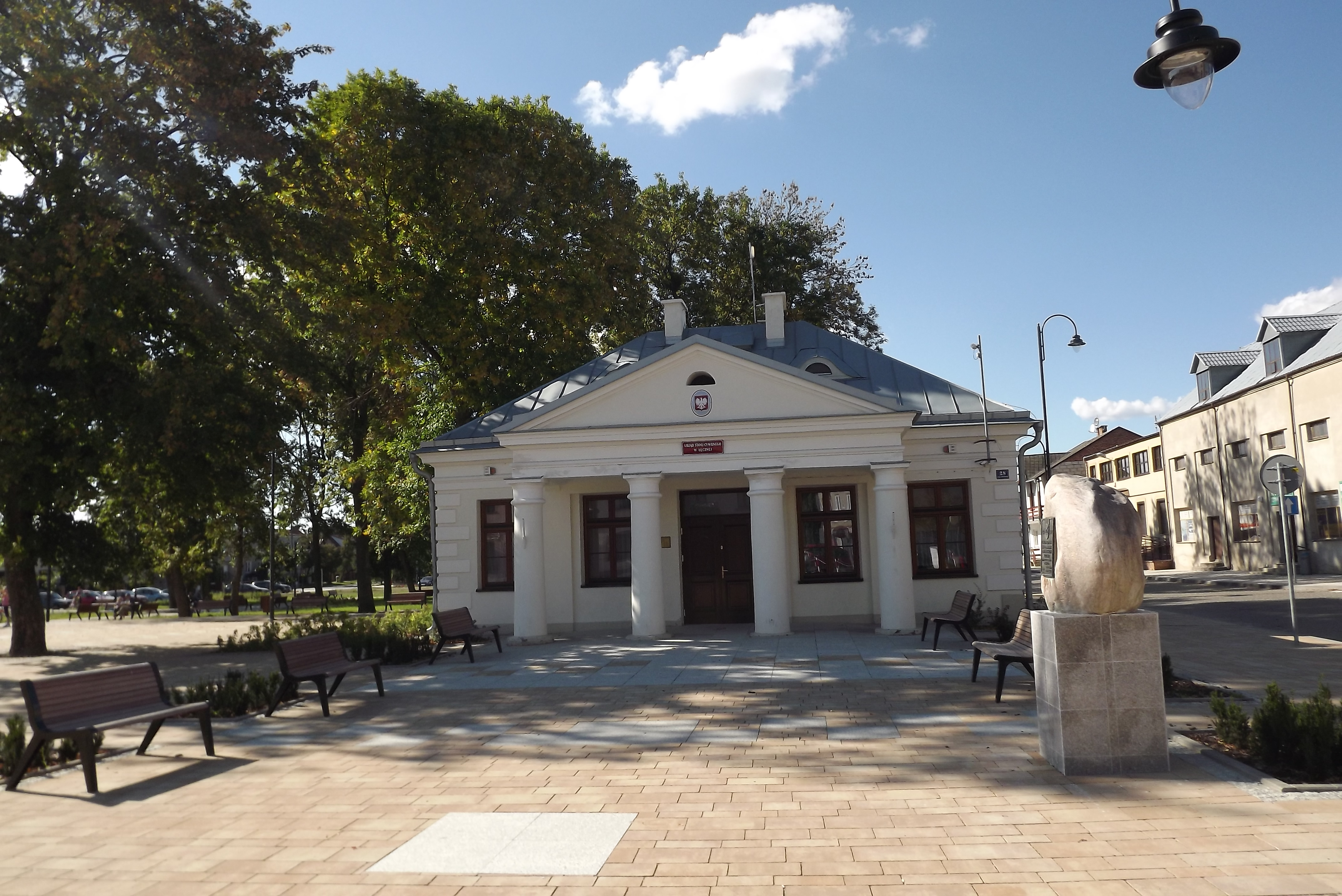
Registry Office, located in the 19th-century Neoclassicist guardhouse

After the Third Partition of Poland (1795), the town, with population of 1,500, became part of the Habsburg Empire, then it belonged to the Duchy of Warsaw (1809), and finally was part of the Congress Poland under Russian Empire (1815–1915). In the 19th and early 20th century, Łęczna was a small, unimportant town, located away from main roads and railways. Until 1866, it remained in private hands, and belonged to several families. Among its owners was Jan Gotlib Bloch. During the January Uprising, clashes between Polish insurgents and Russian troops took place on 30 October, 10 November and 25 December 1863 and 4 May 1864. In 1914, before the outbreak of World War I, Łęczna was the smallest of fourteen towns of Lublin Governorate. During the war, Łęczna lost 41% of its population, as a result of evacuation, forced by Russians. Again part of Poland, after the country regained independence in 1918, administratively it was part of the Lublin Voivodeship. By 1939, its population was 4,300. In the Invasion of Poland, Łęczna was briefly captured by the Red Army (late September 1939), and then handed over by them to Nazi Germany (see Molotov–Ribbentrop Pact).

In the 1960s, rich deposits of Bituminous coal were discovered here. Construction of first coal mine (Bogdanka Coal Mine) began in the nearby village of Bogdanka in 1975. In January 1999, for the first time in history, Łęczna became the seat of a county.

=== Jewish history ===
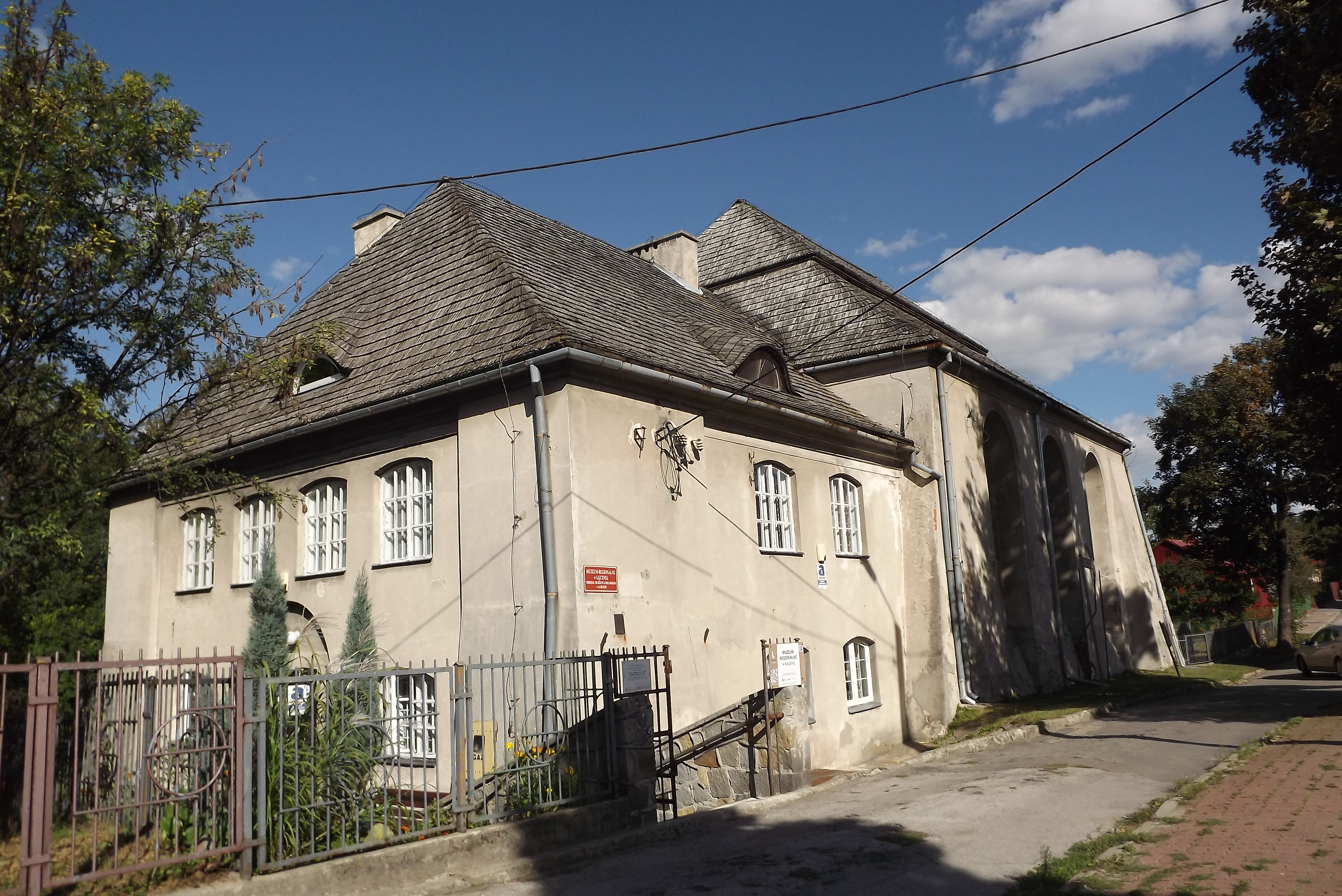
Great Synagogue (now a local museum)

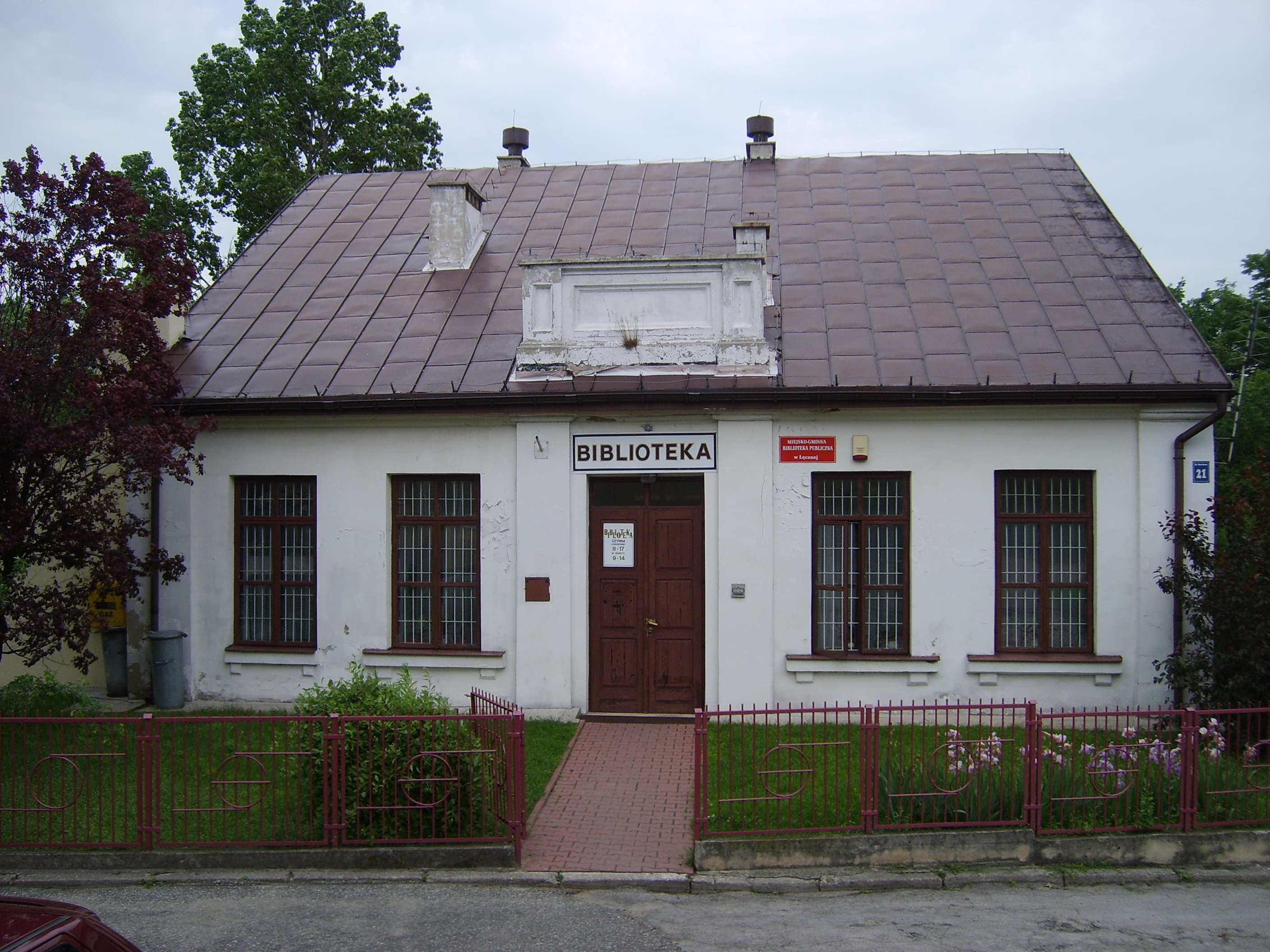
Small Synagogue (now a library)

Łęczna had an evident Jewish community since the 15th century and until the Holocaust, after which no Jewish community existed in town. During the second half of the second millennia Łęczna became an important Jewish center in Central Europe, hosting the Council of Four Lands for several times. By 1803, 38% of the town population were Jews. This ratio of Jews had doubled itself by 1840 into 64%. The Jewish community continued to be prominent in town until World War II, when Nazi Germany occupied the town. In January 1940, a local Judenrat was established in order to organize the Jewish life in Łęczna under Nazi restrictions. During the Holocaust, around 2,500 Jews who lived in town were sent to Sobibor extermination camp and died. The Jewish community of Łęczna had ceased to exist.

Nowadays, a few Jewish establishments from the past still exist in town, among them the big synagogue, hosting the local museum, the small museum, hosting a local library and a Jewish cemetery.

== Gallery ==
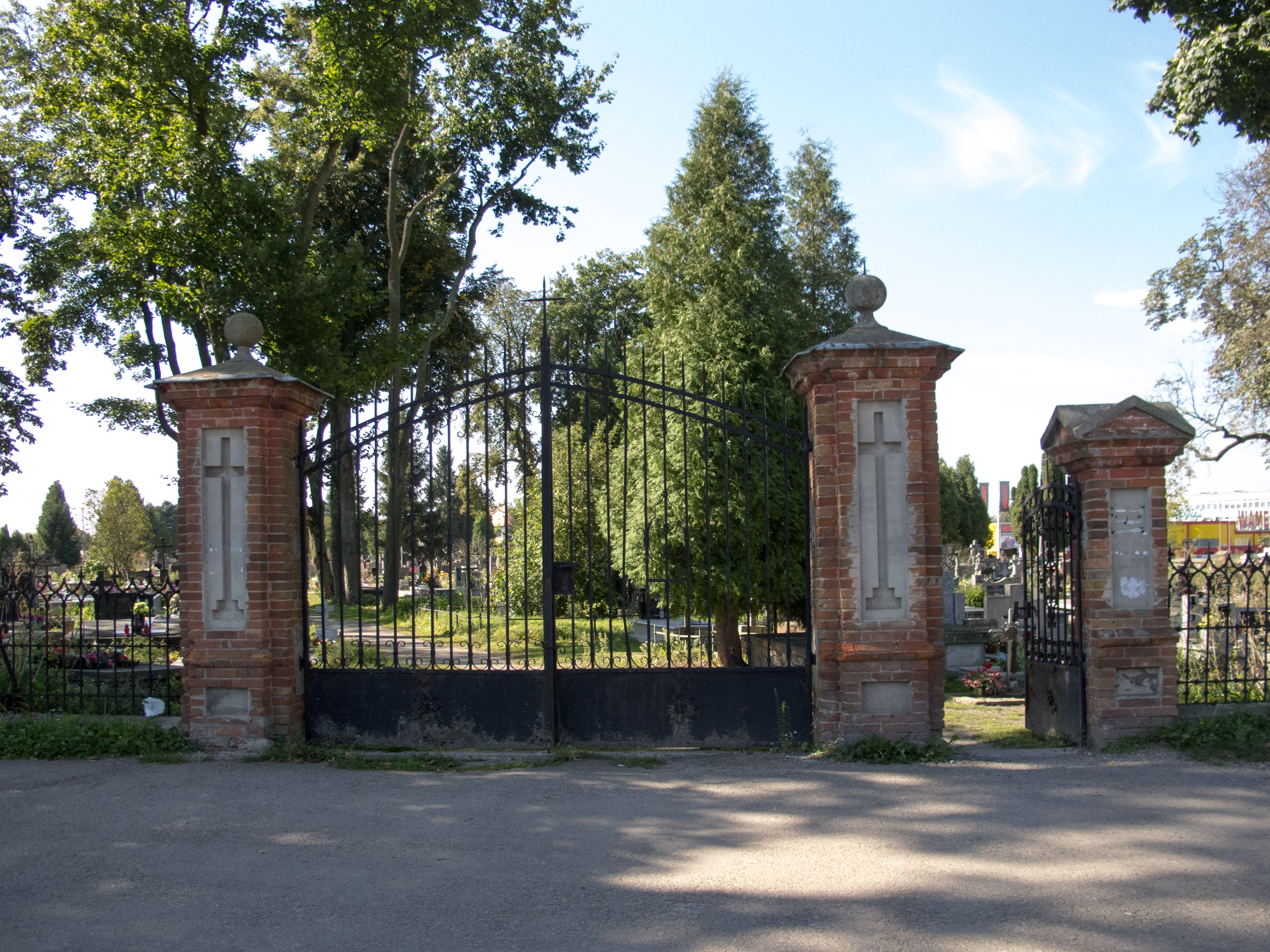
Old Cemetery gate

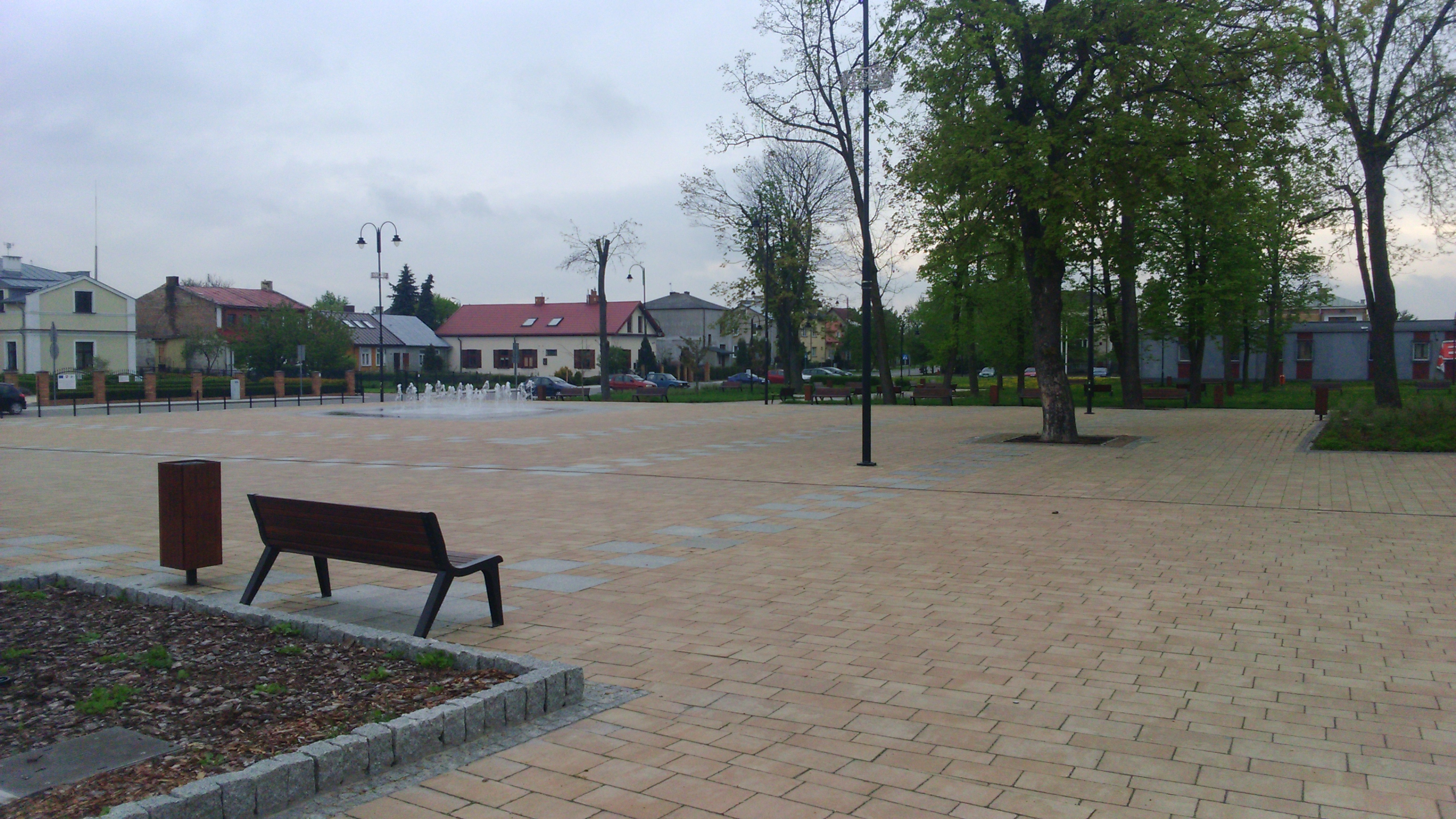
First Market Square of Łęczna

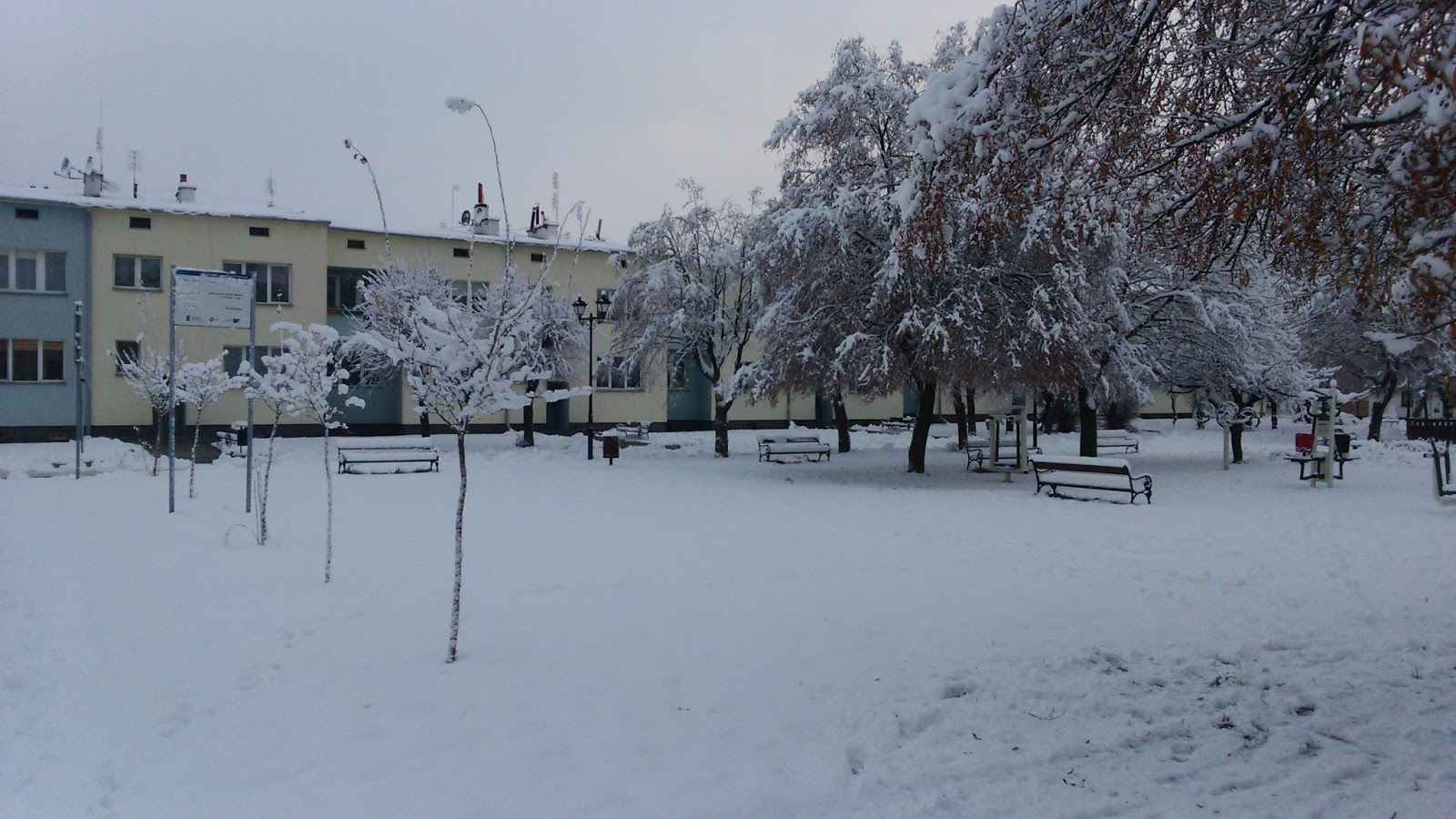
Third Market Square of Łęczna

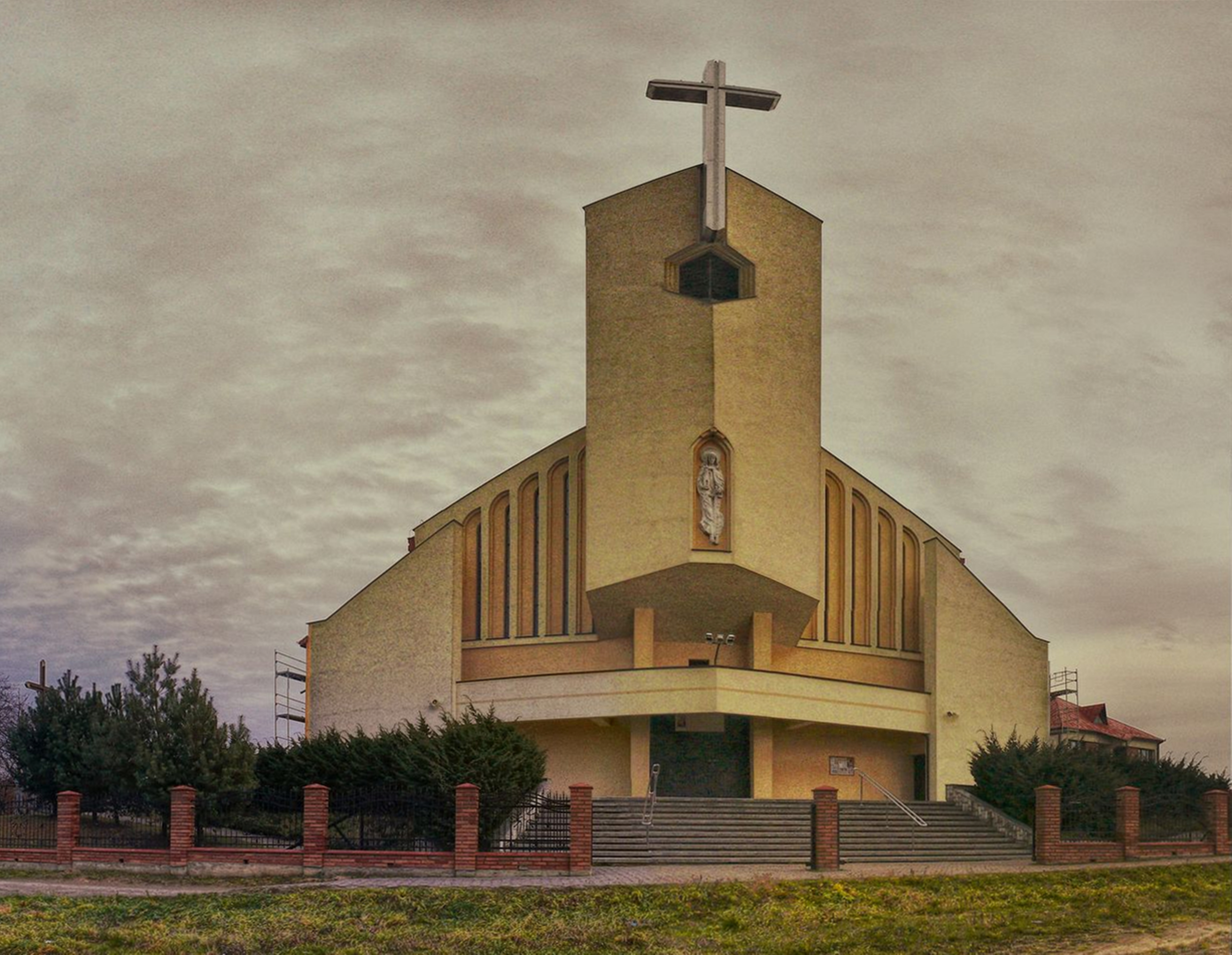
St. Barbara church

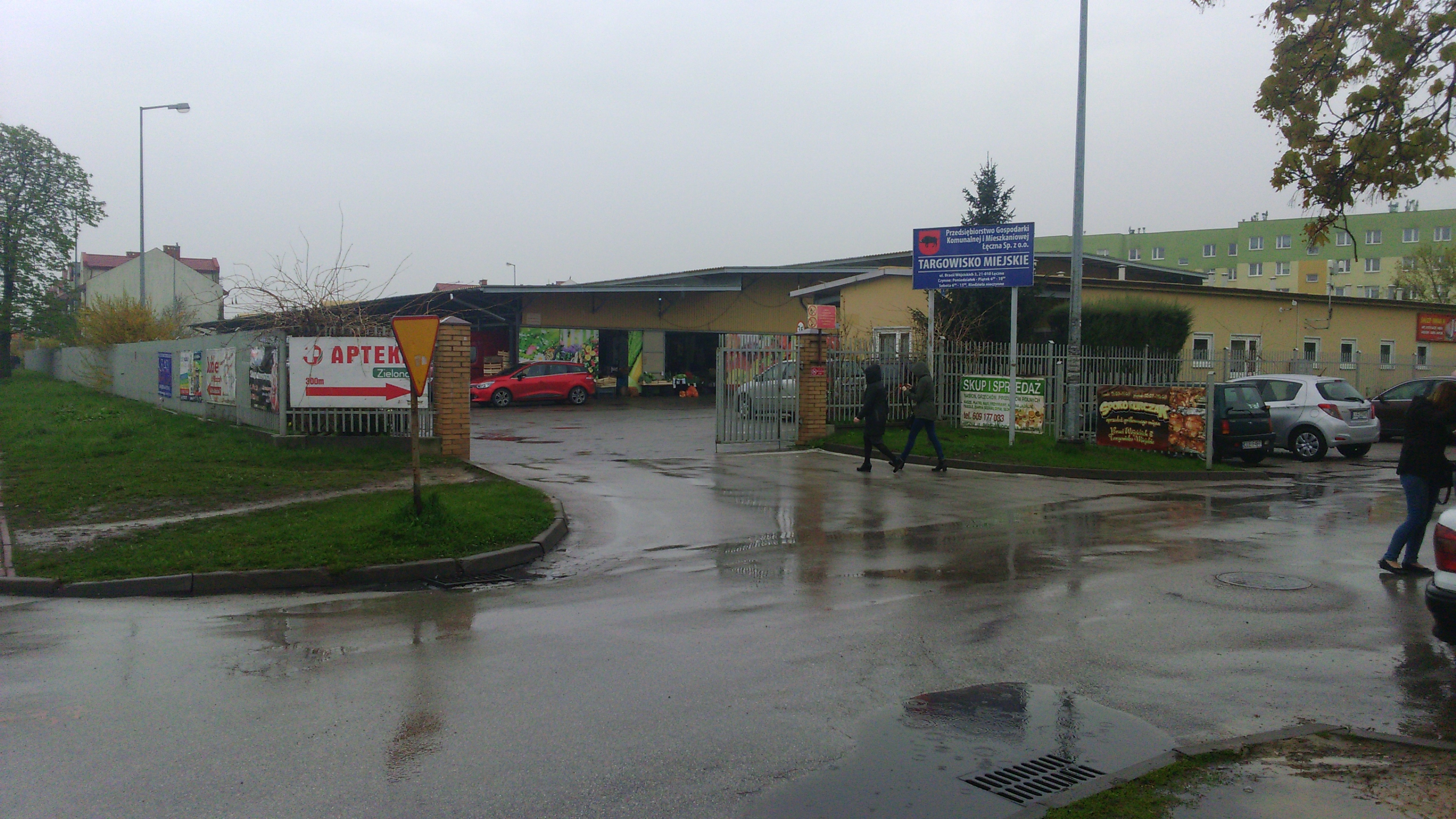
Town's fair

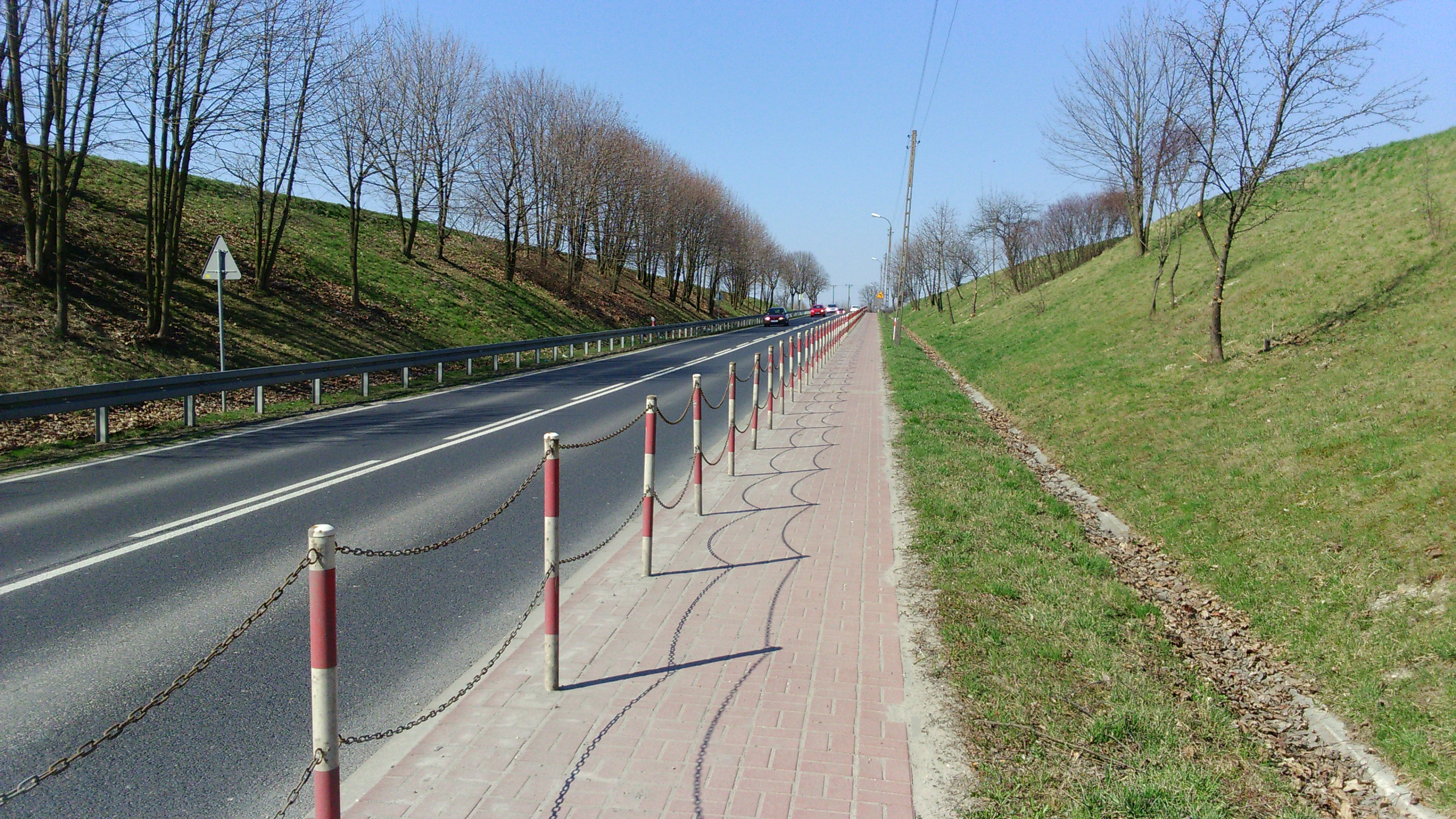
National Road 82

== Tourism ==
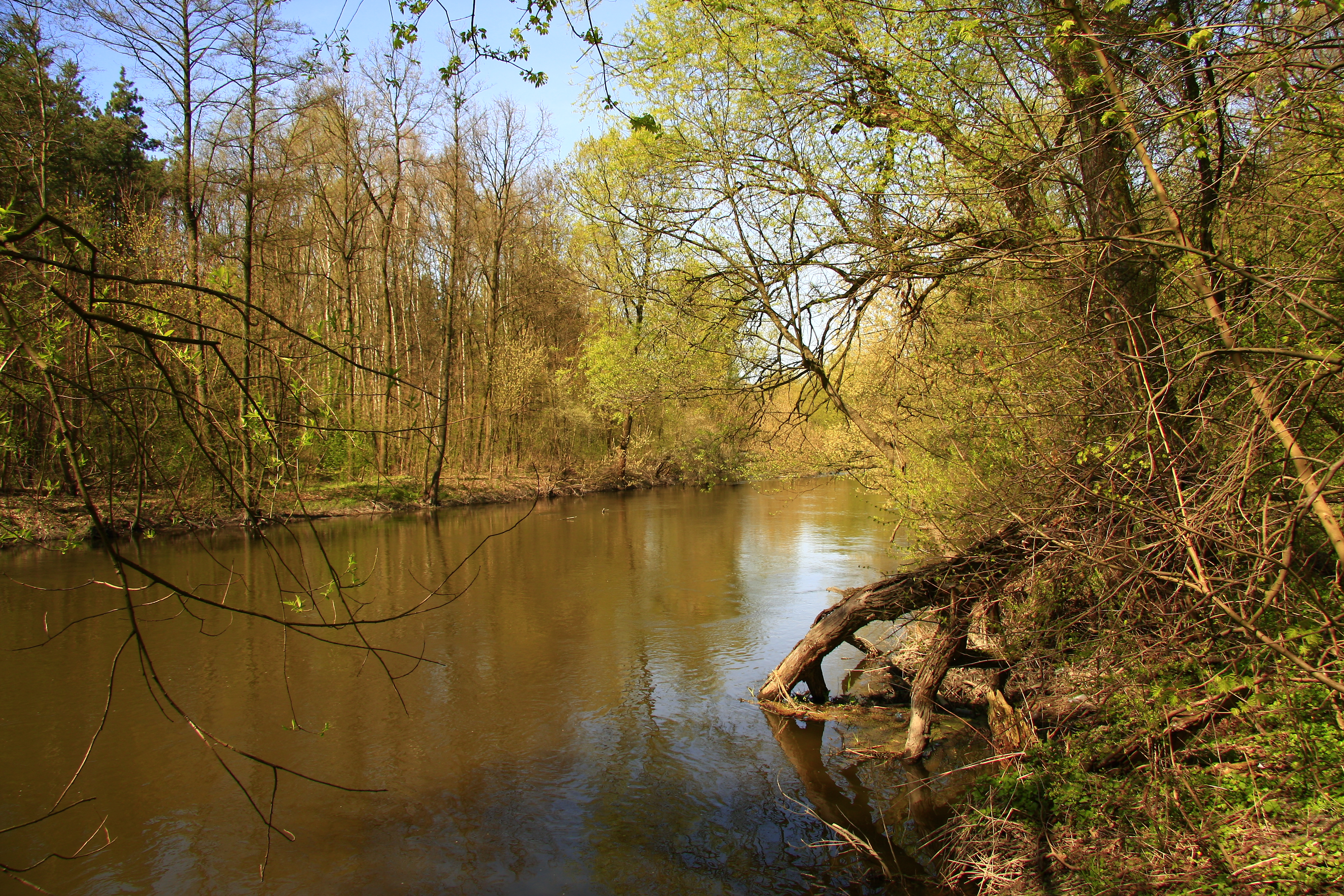
Wieprz River Valley

Łęczna is located in the picturesque region known as Łęczna-Włodawa Lakeland (Pojezierze Łęczyńsko-Włodawskie). There are 68 lakes in the region, whose total area is 2,726 hectares. Furthermore, there are forests rich in birds and animals, and Polesie National Park lies a few kilometers north of the town. The Regional Museum of Łęczna, opened in 1966, is located in a 17th-century synagogue. The town also has St. Mary Magdalene church, built in 1618–1631.

== Economy ==
Since the 1970s the town has benefited from the proximity of profitable coal mining industry. The village of Bogdanka near Łęczna was the place of the first coal mine in the whole area of the Lublin Coal Basin (Lubelskie Zagłębie Węglowe). The town has other small industries, and is regarded as the center of the coal basin

== Sports ==
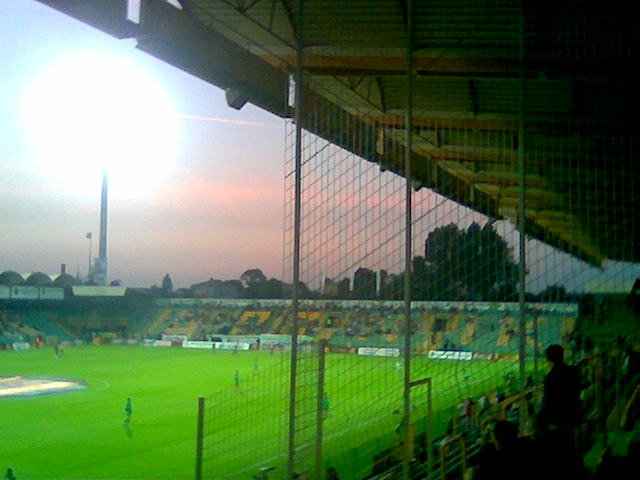
Górnik Łęczna Stadium

- Górnik Łęczna, football team playing in the I liga (as of 2025–26).

== Notable people ==
- Michał Oleksiejczuk, (born 1995) mixed martial artist competing in the middleweight division of the UFC as of 2022.
