= Biskupie =

Biskupie refers to the following places in Poland:

- Biskupie, Greater Poland Voivodeship
- Biskupie, Lublin Voivodeship
- Biskupie-Kolonia, Gmina Wólka
- Biskupie-Kolonia, Gmina Wysokie
