= Miłocin =

Miłocin may refer to the following places:

- Miłocin, Gmina Wojciechów in Lublin Voivodeship (east Poland)
- Miłocin, Pomeranian Voivodeship (north Poland)
- Miłocin, Subcarpathian Voivodeship (south-east Poland)
