= Łuszczów Drugi =

- Village
- Location within Poland
- Coordinates: 51°17′36″N 22°45′13″E
- Country: Poland
- Voivodeship: Lublin
- County: Lublin
- Gmina: Wólka

Area
  - Total: 10.81 km^{2} (4.17 sq mi)

Population (2009)
  - Total: 607
  - Density: 56/km^{2} (150/sq mi)
- Time zone: UTC+1 (CET)
  - Summer (DST): UTC+2 (CEST)
- Postal code: 20-258 (Lublin)
- Area code: +48 81
- Car plates: LUB

Łuszczów Drugi [ˈwuʂt͡ʂuf ˈdruɡi] is a village in the administrative district of Gmina Wólka, within Lublin County, Lublin Voivodeship, in eastern Poland.

== See also ==
- Łuszczów Pierwszy
- Łuszczów-Kolonia
