= Stary Maciejów =

- Village
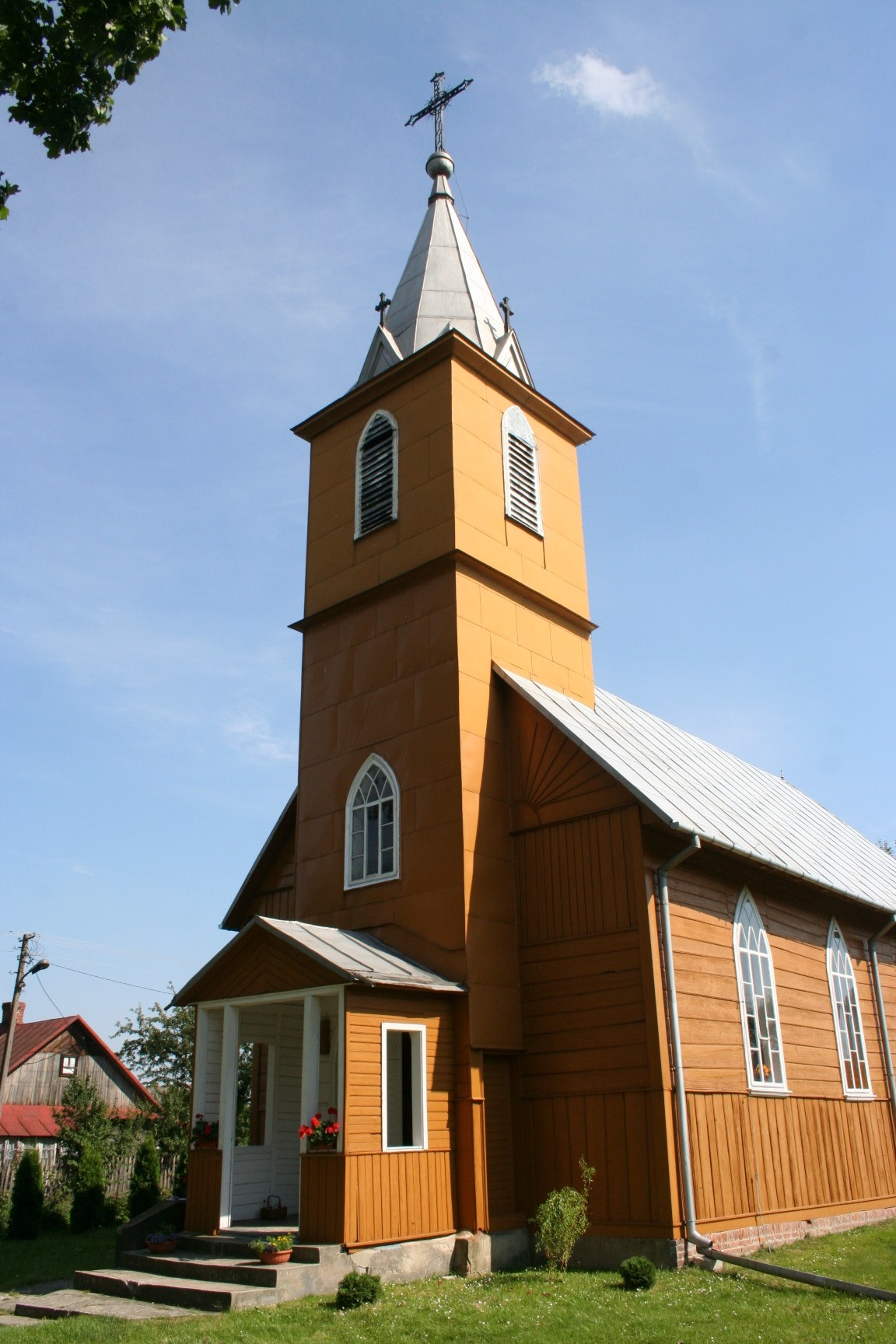

- Location within Poland
- Coordinates: 50°54′02″N 22°43′19″E
- Country: Poland
- Voivodeship: Lublin
- County: Lublin
- Gmina: Wysokie

Stary Maciejów [ˈstarɨ maˈt͡ɕɛjuf] is a village in the administrative district of Gmina Wysokie, within Lublin County, Lublin Voivodeship, in eastern Poland.
