= Kolonia Świdnik Mały =

- Village
- Location within Poland
- Coordinates: 51°14′53″N 22°40′40″E
- Country: Poland
- Voivodeship: Lublin
- County: Lublin
- Gmina: Wólka

Population (2009)
  - Total: 196

Kolonia Świdnik Mały [kɔˈlɔɲa ˈɕfidnik ˈmawɨ] is a village in the administrative district of Gmina Wólka, within Lublin County, Lublin Voivodeship, in eastern Poland.
