= Łosień, Lublin Voivodeship =

Łosień
- Village
- Location within Poland
- Coordinates: 50°55′27″N 22°41′48″E
- Country: Poland
- Voivodeship: Lublin
- County: Lublin
- Gmina: Wysokie

Łosień [ˈwɔɕɛɲ] is a village in the administrative district of Gmina Wysokie, within Lublin County, Lublin Voivodeship, in eastern Poland.
