= Stoczek-Kolonia =

- Village
- Location within Poland
- Coordinates: 51°20′44″N 22°31′24″E
- Country: Poland
- Voivodeship: Lublin
- County: Lublin
- Gmina: Niemce

Stoczek-Kolonia [ˈstɔt͡ʂɛk kɔˈlɔɲa] is a village in the administrative district of Gmina Niemce, within Lublin County, Lublin Voivodeship, in eastern Poland.
