= Krasienin-Kolonia =

- Village
- Location within Poland
- Coordinates: 51°22′3″N 22°28′9″E
- Country: Poland
- Voivodeship: Lublin
- County: Lublin
- Gmina: Niemce

Krasienin-Kolonia [kraˈɕɛnin kɔˈlɔɲa] is a village in the administrative district of Gmina Niemce, within Lublin County, Lublin Voivodeship, in eastern Poland.
