= Halinówka =

- Village
- Location within Poland
- Coordinates: 51°13′52″N 22°12′15″E
- Country: Poland
- Voivodeship: Lublin
- County: Lublin
- Gmina: Wojciechów

Population
  - Total: 100

Halinówka [xaliˈnufka] is a village in the administrative district of Gmina Wojciechów, within Lublin County, Lublin Voivodeship, in eastern Poland.
