= Kosarzew Górny =

- Village
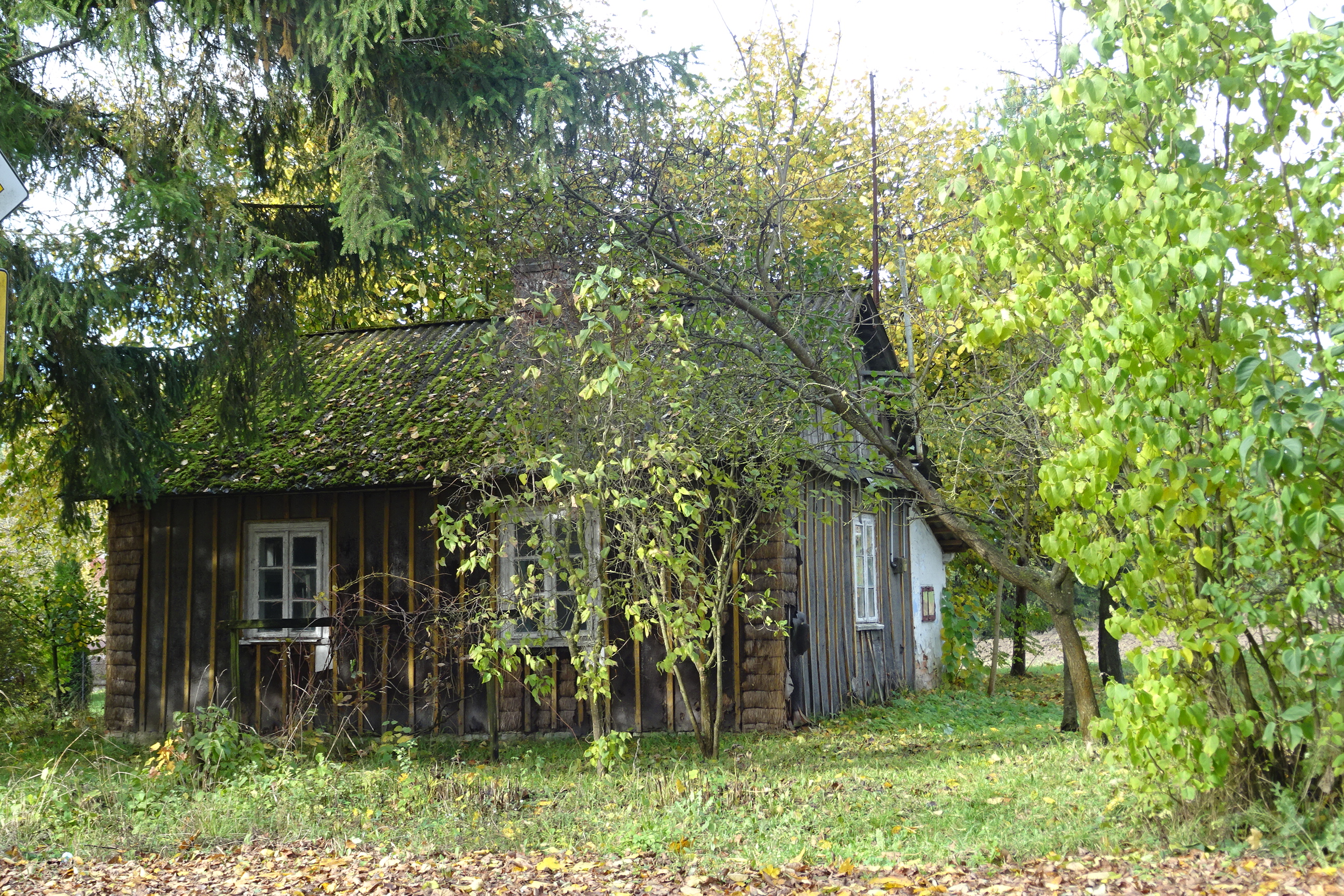

- Location within Poland
- Coordinates: 50°59′N 22°39′E
- Country: Poland
- Voivodeship: Lublin
- County: Lublin
- Gmina: Krzczonów
- Time zone: UTC+1 (CET)
  - Summer (DST): UTC+2 (CEST)

Kosarzew Górny [kɔˈsaʐɛf ˈɡurnɨ] is a village in the administrative district of Gmina Krzczonów, within Lublin County, Lublin Voivodeship, in eastern Poland.

== History ==
Five Polish citizens were murdered by Nazi Germany in the village during World War II.
