= Żuków-Kolonia =

- Village
- Location within Poland
- Coordinates: 51°02′34″N 22°47′05″E
- Country: Poland
- Voivodeship: Lublin
- County: Lublin
- Gmina: Krzczonów

Żuków-Kolonia [ˈʐukuf kɔˈlɔɲa] is a village in the administrative district of Gmina Krzczonów, within Lublin County, Lublin Voivodeship, in eastern Poland.
