= Krzczonów-Folwark =

- Settlement
- Location within Poland
- Coordinates: 51°00′15″N 22°41′45″E
- Country: Poland
- Voivodeship: Lublin
- County: Lublin
- Gmina: Krzczonów

Krzczonów-Folwark [ˈkʂt͡ʂɔnuf ˈfɔlvark] is a settlement in the administrative district of Gmina Krzczonów, within Lublin County, Lublin Voivodeship, in eastern Poland.
