= Cegielnia, Lublin County =

Cegielnia
- Village
- Location within Poland
- Coordinates: 51°35′45″N 22°37′27″E
- Country: Poland
- Voivodeship: Lublin
- County: Lublin
- Gmina: Wysokie

Cegielnia [t͡sɛˈɡʲɛlɲa] is a village in the administrative district of Gmina Wysokie, within Lublin County, Lublin Voivodeship, in eastern Poland.
