= Turka, Lublin County =

Turka
- Village
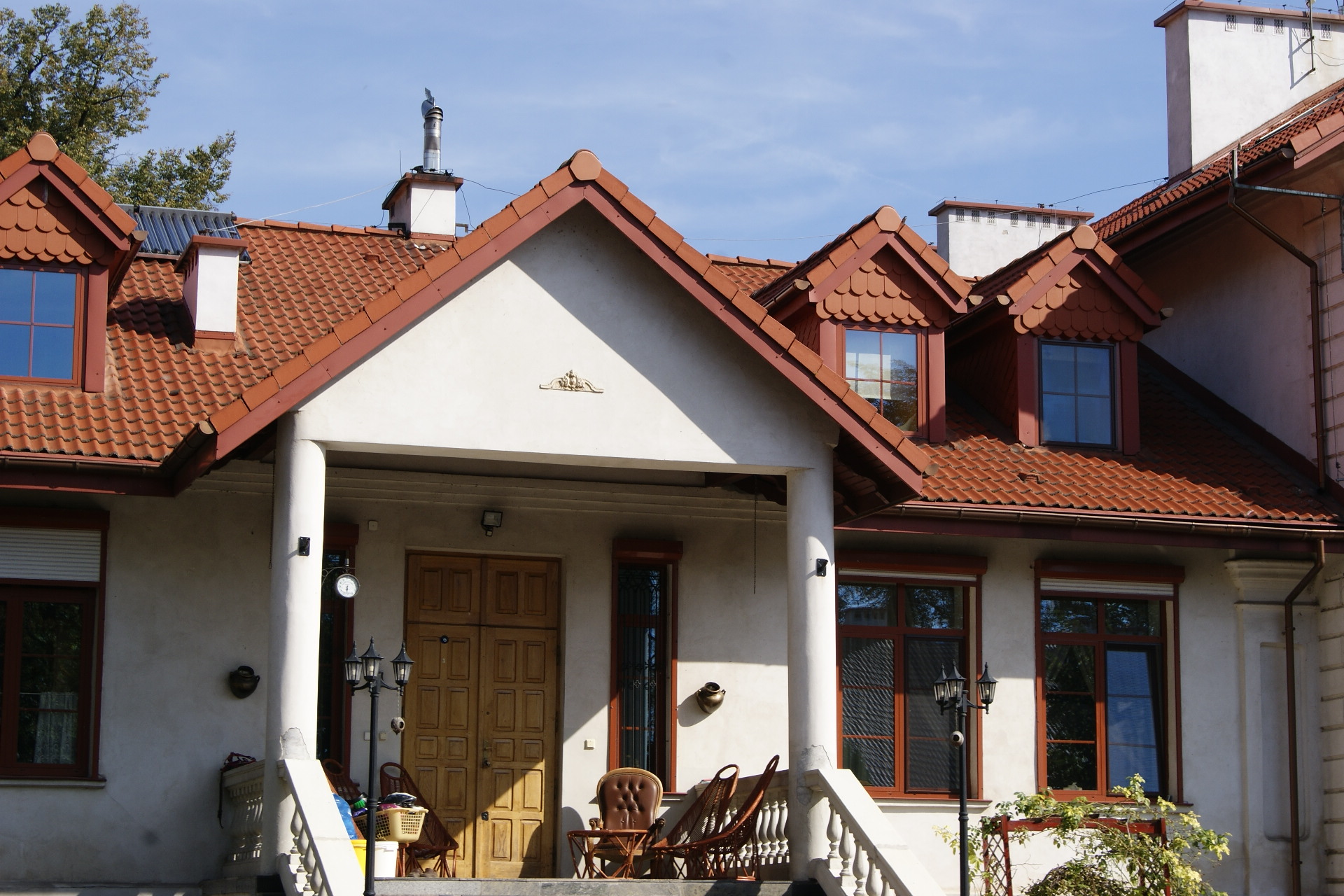
- Old manor house in Turka

- Location within Poland
- Coordinates: 51°17′N 22°40′E
- Country: Poland
- Voivodeship: Lublin
- County: Lublin
- Gmina: Wólka

Population (2009)
  - Total: 3,214
- Time zone: UTC+1 (CET)
  - Summer (DST): UTC+2 (CEST)
- Postal code: 20-258
- Vehicle registration: LUB

Turka [ˈturka] is a village in the administrative district of Gmina Wólka, within Lublin County, Lublin Voivodeship, in eastern Poland. It is situated on the Bystrzyca River.

== Demographics ==
Historical population
Year	Pop.	±%
1827	200	—
1921	475	+137.5%

In 1921, the population was entirely Polish by nationality.
