= Rudnik, Lublin County =

Rudnik
- Village
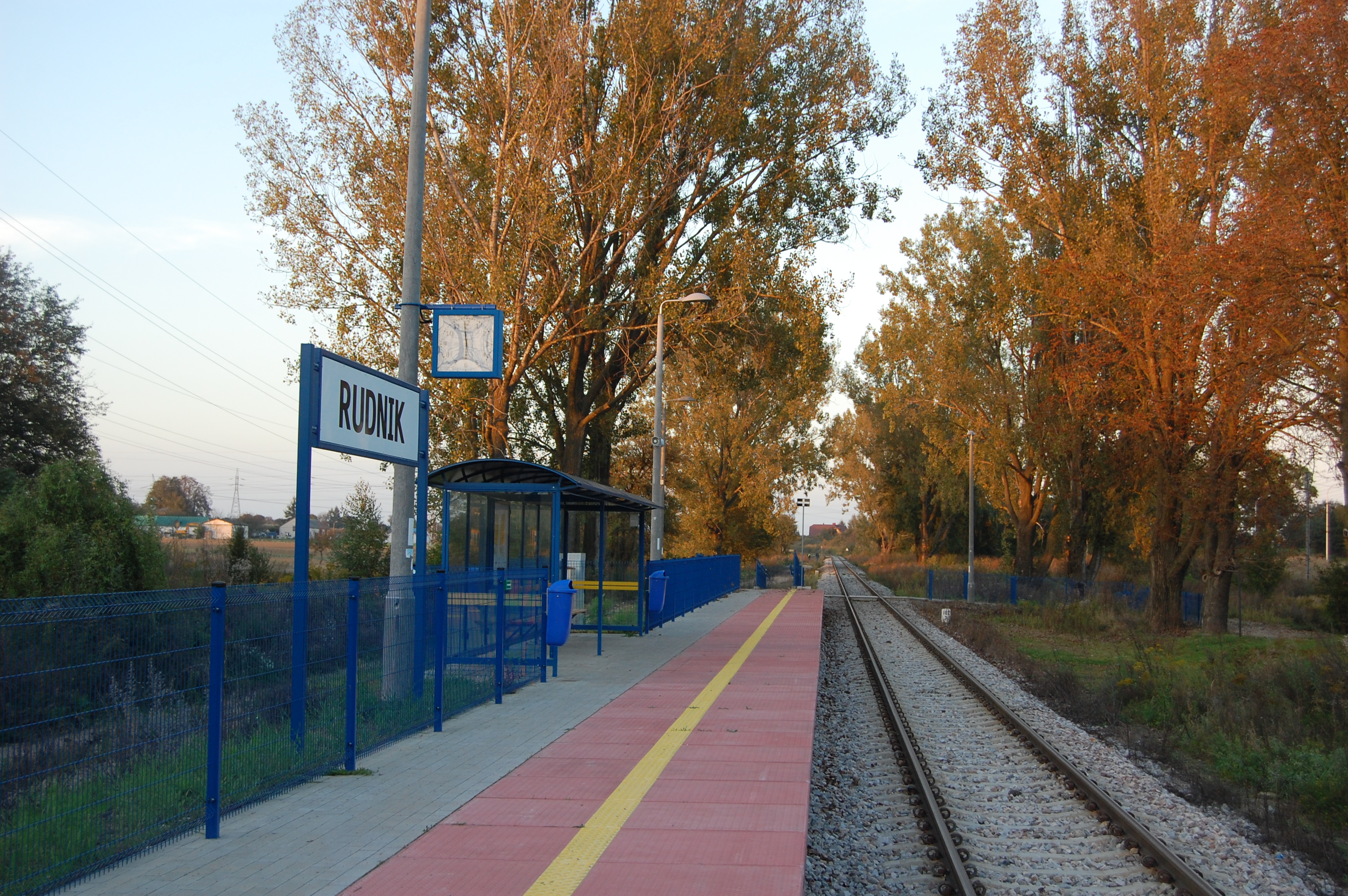
- Rudnik railway station

- Location within Poland
- Coordinates: 51°17′00″N 22°35′52″E
- Country: Poland
- Voivodeship: Lublin
- County: Lublin
- Gmina: Wólka

Population (2009)
  - Total: 399

Rudnik (Polish pronunciation: [ˈrudɲik]) is a village in the administrative district of Gmina Wólka, within Lublin County, Lublin Voivodeship, in eastern Poland.
