= Majdan Krasieniński =

- Village
- Location within Poland
- Coordinates: 51°20′37″N 22°27′0″E
- Country: Poland
- Voivodeship: Lublin
- County: Lublin
- Gmina: Niemce
- Time zone: UTC+1 (CET)
  - Summer (DST): UTC+2 (CEST)
- Vehicle registration: LUB

Majdan Krasieniński (Polish pronunciation: [ˈmajdaŋ kraɕɛˈɲij̃skʲi]) is a village in the administrative district of Gmina Niemce, within Lublin County, Lublin Voivodeship, in eastern Poland.

== History ==
As of 1921, Majdan Krasieniński consisted of a village and adjacent colony, which combined had a population of 615, 97.7% Polish and 1.8% Jewish.

Following the German-Soviet invasion of Poland, which started World War II in September 1939, the village was occupied by Germany until 1944. On 12 September 1942, the German occupiers and Ukrainian auxiliaries murdered local 17-year-old Pole Edward Majewski.
