= Krzczonów-Skałka =

- Settlement
- Location within Poland
- Coordinates: 51°00′54″N 22°41′56″E
- Country: Poland
- Voivodeship: Lublin
- County: Lublin
- Gmina: Krzczonów

Krzczonów-Skałka [ˈkʂt͡ʂɔnuf ˈskau̯ka] is a settlement in the administrative district of Gmina Krzczonów, within Lublin County, Lublin Voivodeship, in eastern Poland.
