= Baszki =

- Village
- Location within Poland
- Coordinates: 51°19′N 22°37′E
- Country: Poland
- Voivodeship: Lublin
- County: Lublin
- Gmina: Niemce

Baszki [ˈbaʂki] is a village in the administrative district of Gmina Niemce, within Lublin County, Lublin Voivodeship, in eastern Poland.
