= Antoniówka, Gmina Wysokie =

Antoniówka
- Village
- Location within Poland
- Coordinates: 50°55′34″N 22°44′55″E
- Country: Poland
- Voivodeship: Lublin
- County: Lublin
- Gmina: Wysokie

Antoniówka [antɔˈɲufka] is a village in the administrative district of Gmina Wysokie, within Lublin County, Lublin Voivodeship, in eastern Poland.
