= Łubki-Szlachta =

- Village
- Location within Poland
- Coordinates: 51°13′54″N 22°09′48″E
- Country: Poland
- Voivodeship: Lublin
- County: Lublin
- Gmina: Wojciechów

Łubki-Szlachta [ˈwupki ˈʂlaxta] is a village in the administrative district of Gmina Wojciechów, within Lublin County, Lublin Voivodeship, in eastern Poland.
