= Zielona, Lublin Voivodeship =

Zielona
- Village
- Location within Poland
- Coordinates: 50°59′39″N 22°40′08″E
- Country: Poland
- Voivodeship: Lublin
- County: Lublin
- Gmina: Krzczonów

Zielona [ʑɛˈlɔna] is a village in the administrative district of Gmina Krzczonów, within Lublin County, Lublin Voivodeship, in eastern Poland.
