= Łubki-Kolonia =

- Village
- Location within Poland
- Coordinates: 51°14′12″N 22°08′58″E
- Country: Poland
- Voivodeship: Lublin
- County: Lublin
- Gmina: Wojciechów

Łubki-Kolonia [ˈwupki kɔˈlɔɲa] is a village in the administrative district of Gmina Wojciechów, within Lublin County, Lublin Voivodeship, in eastern Poland.

As of 2021, the population was 154 and area 3.05 km (2 mi)²., which makes the population density of the area 50.49/km².

The population in 2011 was 174, which means the village has had an annual population decline of 1.1% annually over a decade.
