= Góra, Lublin Voivodeship =

Góra
- Village
- Location within Poland
- Coordinates: 51°13′N 22°11′E
- Country: Poland
- Voivodeship: Lublin
- County: Lublin
- Gmina: Wojciechów

Góra [ˈɡura] is a village in the administrative district of Gmina Wojciechów, within Lublin County, Lublin Voivodeship, in eastern Poland.
