= Krasienin =

- Village
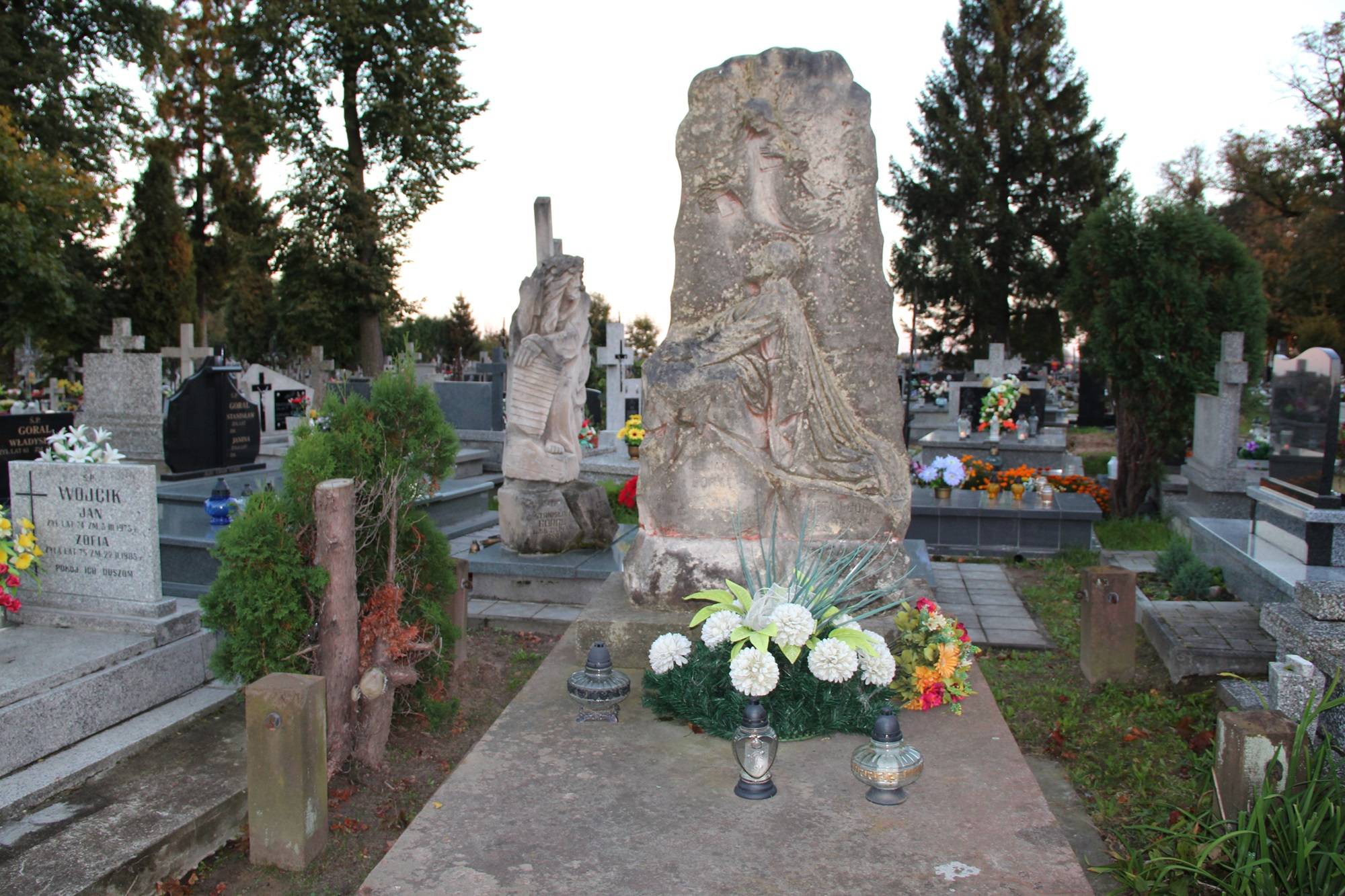
- Parish cemetery in Krasienin

- Location within Poland
- Coordinates: 51°21′37″N 22°27′23″E
- Country: Poland
- Voivodeship: Lublin
- County: Lublin
- Gmina: Niemce
- Time zone: UTC+1 (CET)
  - Summer (DST): UTC+2 (CEST)
- Vehicle registration: LUB

Krasienin [kraˈɕɛnin] is a village in the administrative district of Gmina Niemce, within Lublin County, Lublin Voivodeship, in eastern Poland.

== History ==
Historical population
Year	Pop.	±%
1827	434	—
1921	332	−23.5%

The first Catholic church and parish was founded by nobleman Jakub Koniński of Rawa coat of arms.

According to the 1921 Polish census, the population was 98.5% Polish and 1.2% Ukrainian.

Following the German-Soviet invasion of Poland, which started World War II in September 1939, the village was occupied by Germany until 1944. On 12 September 1942, the German occupiers and Ukrainian auxiliaries committed a massacre of five Poles.
