= Wojciechów-Kolonia Pierwsza =

- Village
- Location within Poland
- Coordinates: 51°14′19″N 22°13′25″E
- Country: Poland
- Voivodeship: Lublin
- County: Lublin
- Gmina: Wojciechów

Wojciechów-Kolonia Pierwsza (Polish pronunciation: [vɔjˈt͡ɕɛxuf kɔˈlɔɲa ˈpjɛrfʂa]) is a village in the administrative district of Gmina Wojciechów, within Lublin County, Lublin Voivodeship, in eastern Poland.
