= Palikije Drugie =

- Village
- Location within Poland
- Coordinates: 51°14′21″N 22°16′55″E
- Country: Poland
- Voivodeship: Lublin
- County: Lublin
- Gmina: Wojciechów

Palikije Drugie [paliˈkijɛ ˈdruɡʲɛ] is a village in the administrative district of Gmina Wojciechów, within Lublin County, Lublin Voivodeship, in eastern Poland.
