= Jakubowice Konińskie =

Village in Lublin County

Jakubowrice Konińskie
- Village
- Location within Poland
- Coordinates: 51°18′45″N 22°31′44″E
- Country: Poland
- Voivodeship: Lublin
- County: Lublin
- Gmina: Niemce

Population
  - Total: 710

Jakubowice Konińskie [jakubɔˈvit͡sɛ kɔˈniɲskʲɛ] is a village in the administrative district of Gmina Niemce, within Lublin County, Lublin Voivodeship, in eastern Poland.
