= Łysaków =

Łysaków may refer to the following places:

- Łysaków, Lublin Voivodeship (east Poland)
- Łysaków, Mielec County in Subcarpathian Voivodeship (south-east Poland)
- Łysaków, Stalowa Wola County in Subcarpathian Voivodeship (south-east Poland)
- Łysaków, Silesian Voivodeship (south Poland)
