= Zabłocie, Lublin County =

Zabłocie
- Village
- Location within Poland
- Coordinates: 50°52′15″N 22°39′39″E
- Country: Poland
- Voivodeship: Lublin
- County: Lublin
- Gmina: Wysokie

Zabłocie [zaˈbwɔt͡ɕɛ] is a village in the administrative district of Gmina Wysokie, within Lublin County, Lublin Voivodeship, in eastern Poland.
