= Kolonia Pliszczyn =

- Village
- Location within Poland
- Coordinates: 51°18′7″N 22°38′11″E
- Country: Poland
- Voivodeship: Lublin
- County: Lublin
- Gmina: Wólka

Population (2009)
  - Total: 334

Kolonia Pliszczyn [kɔˈlɔɲa ˈpliʂt͡ʂɨn] is a village in the administrative district of Gmina Wólka, within Lublin County, Lublin Voivodeship, in eastern Poland.
