= Bystrzyca, Lublin County =

Bystrzyca
- Village
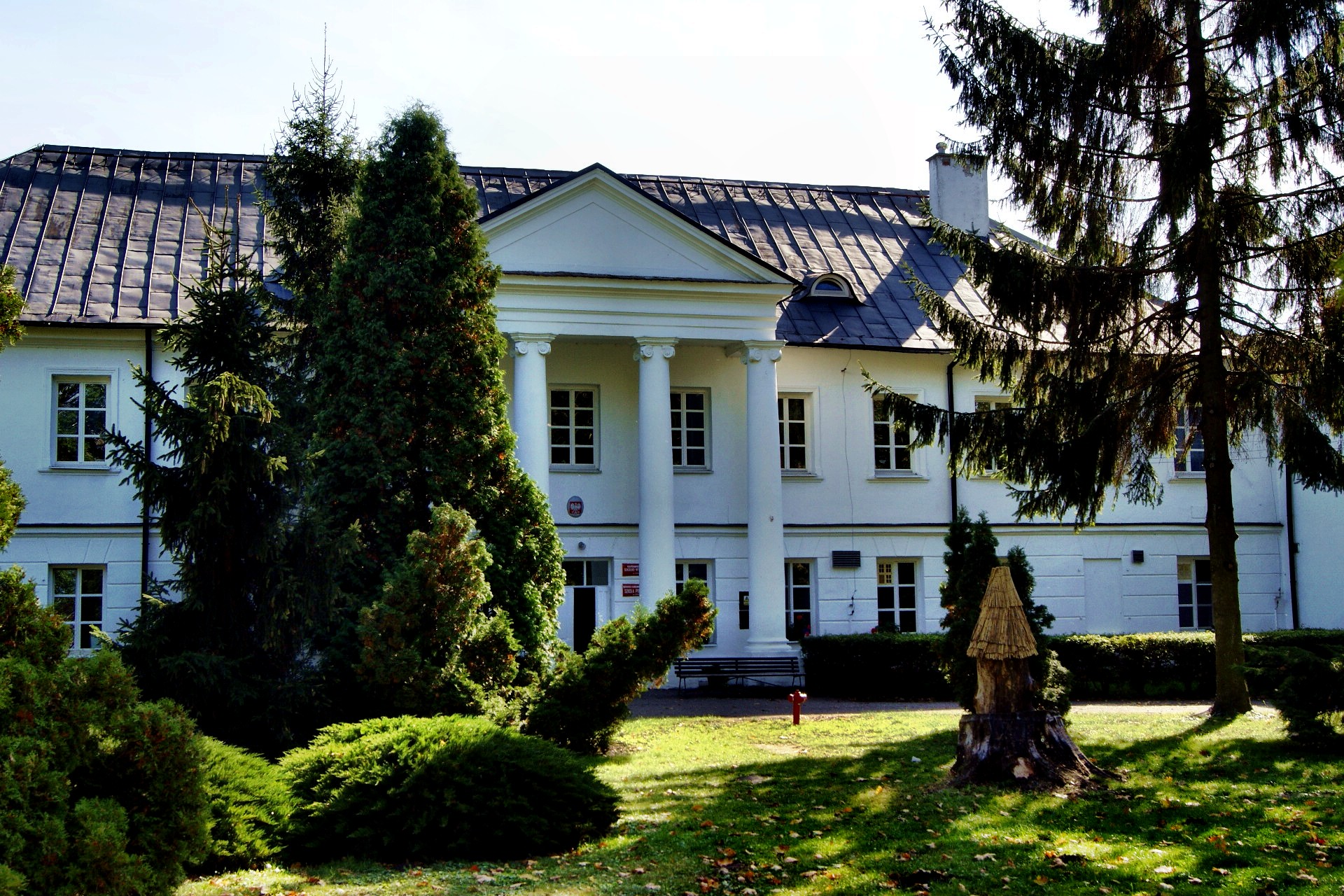
- Old manor house in Bystrzyca

- Location within Poland
- Coordinates: 51°18′34″N 22°42′12″E
- Country: Poland
- Voivodeship: Lublin
- County: Lublin
- Gmina: Wólka

Population (2009)
  - Total: 396
- Time zone: UTC+1 (CET)
  - Summer (DST): UTC+2 (CEST)
- Postal code: 20-258
- Vehicle registration: LUB

Bystrzyca [bɨsˈtʂɨt͡sa] is a village in the administrative district of Gmina Wólka, within Lublin County, Lublin Voivodeship, in eastern Poland.
