= Majdan Policki =

- Village
- Location within Poland
- Coordinates: 51°5′N 22°46′E
- Country: Poland
- Voivodeship: Lublin
- County: Lublin
- Gmina: Krzczonów

Majdan Policki (Polish pronunciation: [ˈmajdan pɔˈlitskʲi]) is a village in the administrative district of Gmina Krzczonów, within Lublin County, Lublin Voivodeship, in eastern Poland.
