= Sporniak, Gmina Wojciechów =

Sporniak
- Village
- Location within Poland
- Coordinates: 51°13′56″N 22°19′40″E
- Country: Poland
- Voivodeship: Lublin
- County: Lublin
- Gmina: Wojciechów

Sporniak [ˈspɔrɲak] is a village in the administrative district of Gmina Wojciechów, within Lublin County, Lublin Voivodeship, in eastern Poland.
