= Antoniówka, Gmina Krzczonów =

Antoniówka
- Village
- Location within Poland
- Coordinates: 51°3′49″N 22°46′11″E
- Country: Poland
- Voivodeship: Lublin
- County: Lublin
- Gmina: Krzczonów

Antoniówka [antɔˈɲufka] is a village in the administrative district of Gmina Krzczonów, within Lublin County, Lublin Voivodeship, in eastern Poland.
