= Żuków Drugi =

- Village
- Location within Poland
- Coordinates: 51°02′20″N 22°45′57″E
- Country: Poland
- Voivodeship: Lublin
- County: Lublin
- Gmina: Krzczonów

Żuków Drugi [ˈʐukuf ˈdruɡi] is a village in the administrative district of Gmina Krzczonów, within Lublin County, Lublin Voivodeship, in eastern Poland.
