= Elizówka, Lublin County =

Village in Lublin County

Elizówka
- Village
- Location within Poland
- Coordinates: 51°17′39″N 22°34′46″E
- Country: Poland
- Voivodeship: Lublin
- County: Lublin
- Gmina: Niemce

Elizówka [ɛliˈzufka] is a village in the administrative district of Gmina Niemce, within Lublin County, Lublin Voivodeship, in eastern Poland.
