= Stasin, Gmina Wojciechów =

Stasin
- Village
- Location within Poland
- Coordinates: 51°13′09″N 22°17′11″E
- Country: Poland
- Voivodeship: Lublin
- County: Lublin
- Gmina: Wojciechów

Stasin [ˈstaɕin] is a village in the administrative district of Gmina Wojciechów, within Lublin County, Lublin Voivodeship, in eastern Poland.
