= Spławy, Lublin County =

Spławy
- Village
- Location within Poland
- Coordinates: 50°56′10″N 22°37′39″E
- Country: Poland
- Voivodeship: Lublin
- County: Lublin
- Gmina: Wysokie

Spławy [ˈspwavɨ] is a village in the administrative district of Gmina Wysokie, within Lublin County, Lublin Voivodeship, in eastern Poland.
