= Pustelnik, Lublin Voivodeship =

Pustelnik
- Village
- Location within Poland
- Coordinates: 51°1′N 22°48′E
- Country: Poland
- Voivodeship: Lublin
- County: Lublin
- Gmina: Krzczonów

Pustelnik [pusˈtɛlɲik] is a village in the administrative district of Gmina Krzczonów, within Lublin County, Lublin Voivodeship, in eastern Poland.
