= Pryszczowa Góra =

- Village
- Location within Poland
- Coordinates: 51°24′N 22°27′E
- Country: Poland
- Voivodeship: Lublin
- County: Lublin
- Gmina: Niemce

Pryszczowa Góra [prɨʂˈt͡ʂɔva ˈɡura] is a village in the administrative district of Gmina Niemce, within Lublin County, Lublin Voivodeship, in eastern Poland.
