= Łuszczów Pierwszy =

- Village
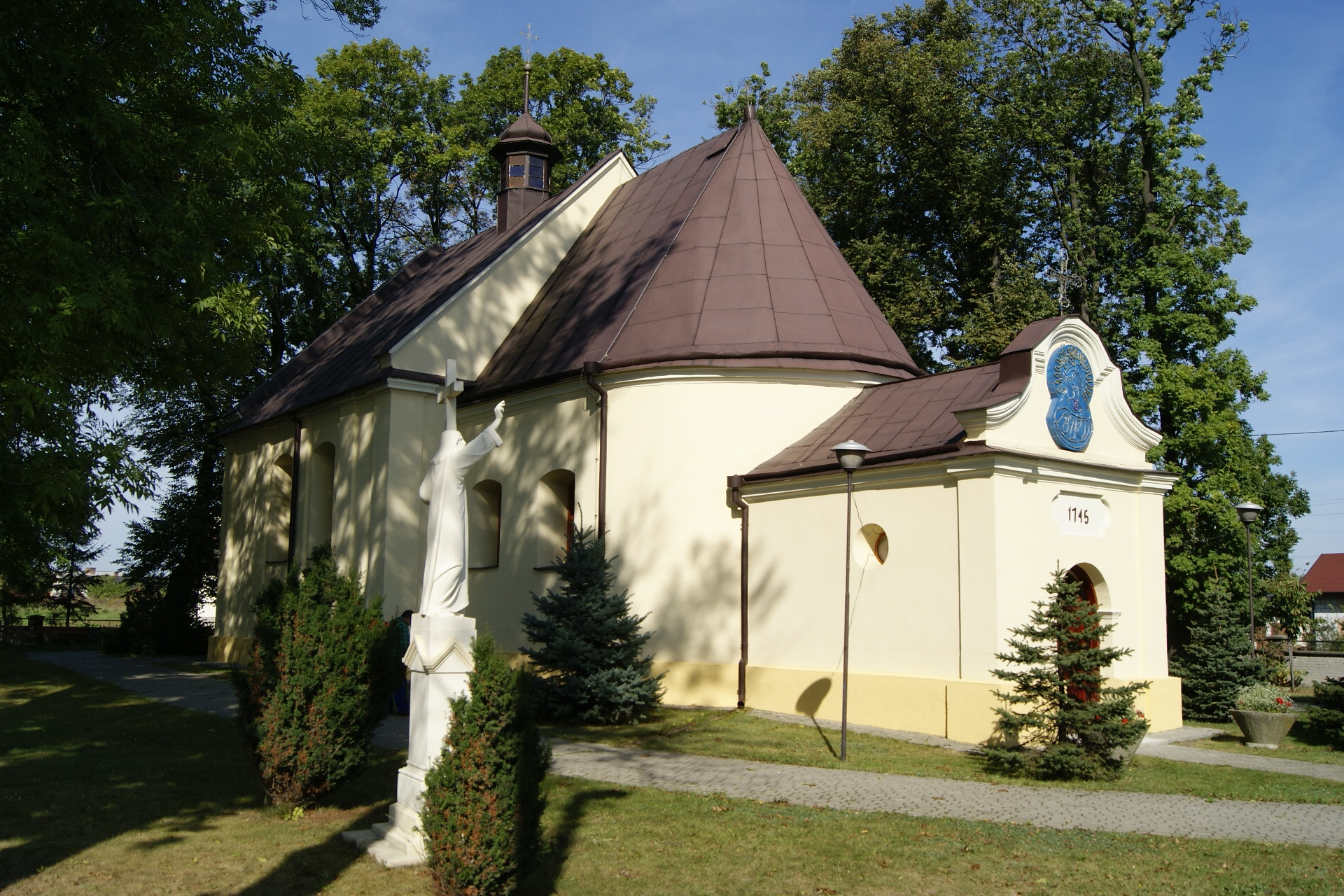

- Location within Poland
- Coordinates: 51°18′7″N 22°43′38″E
- Country: Poland
- Voivodeship: Lublin
- County: Lublin
- Gmina: Wólka

Area
  - Total: 7.16 km^{2} (2.76 sq mi)
- Highest elevation: 191 m (627 ft)
- Lowest elevation: 172 m (564 ft)

Population (2014)
  - Total: 881
  - Density: 123/km^{2} (320/sq mi)
- Time zone: UTC+1 (CET)
  - Summer (DST): UTC+2 (CEST)
- Postal code: 20-258 (Lublin)
- Area code: +48 81
- Vehicle registration: LUB

Łuszczów Pierwszy [ˈwuʂt͡ʂuf ˈpjɛrfʂɨ] is a village in the administrative district of Gmina Wólka, within Lublin County, Lublin Voivodeship, in eastern Poland.

== History ==
Three Polish citizens were murdered by Nazi Germany in the village during World War II.

== See also ==
- Łuszczów Drugi
- Łuszczów-Kolonia
