= Kosarzew-Stróża =

- Village
- Location within Poland
- Coordinates: 50°58′43″N 22°38′06″E
- Country: Poland
- Voivodeship: Lublin
- County: Lublin
- Gmina: Krzczonów

Kosarzew-Stróża [kɔˈsaʐɛf ˈstruʐa] is a village in the administrative district of Gmina Krzczonów, within Lublin County, Lublin Voivodeship, in eastern Poland.
