= Boduszyn =

- Village
- Location within Poland
- Coordinates: 51°19′33″N 22°38′29″E
- Country: Poland
- Voivodeship: Lublin
- County: Lublin
- Gmina: Niemce

Boduszyn [bɔˈduʂɨn] is a village in the administrative district of Gmina Niemce, within Lublin County, Lublin Voivodeship, in eastern Poland.
