= Wola Krasienińska =

- Village
- Location within Poland
- Coordinates: 51°21′50″N 22°28′50″E
- Country: Poland
- Voivodeship: Lublin
- County: Lublin
- Gmina: Niemce

Wola Krasienińska (Polish pronunciation: [ˈvɔla kraɕɛˈɲij̃ska]) is a village in the administrative district of Gmina Niemce, within Lublin County, Lublin Voivodeship, in eastern Poland.
