= Turystyczna street (Lublin) =

Street in Lublin, Poland

Turystyczna
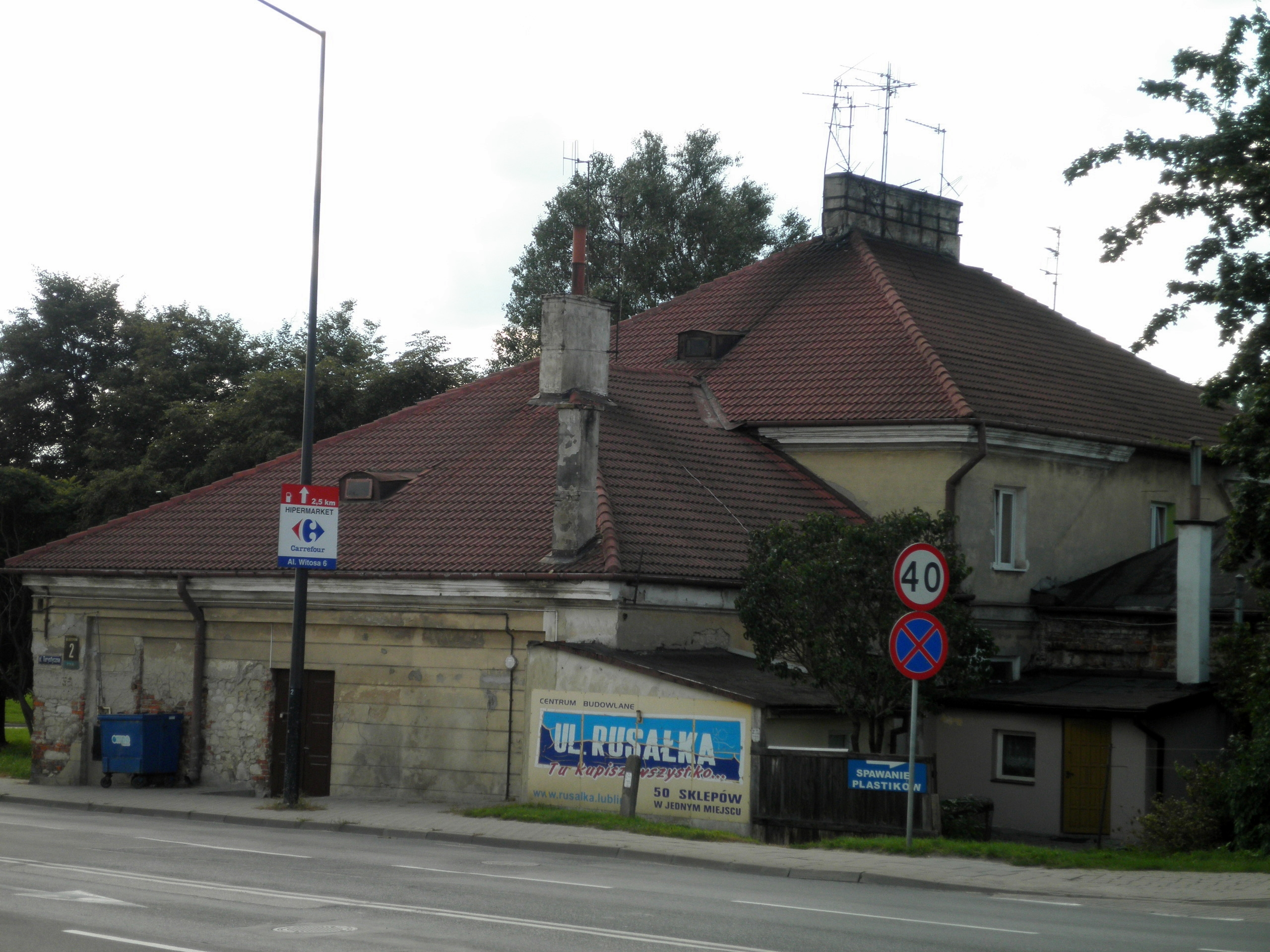
- Budzyń pub at Turystyczna street
- Interactive map of Turystyczna
- Length: 3 km (1.9 mi)
- Location: Lublin, Poland
- Coordinates: 51°15′28.87″N 22°36′42.96″E
- From: Lt. Henryk Cybulski roundabout: Mełgiewska street / E. Grafa street
- To: Lublin city border

Turystyczna (English: Touristic street) is a street located in Lublin, eastern Poland. It starts at the intersection of Mełgiewska street and Emmanuela Grafa street (at the tripoint of Kalinowszczyzna, Tatary and Hajdów-Zadębie city districts) and leads to the city border near the village of Wólka. The street is about 3 km (1.9 miles) long, runs along the biggest river in Lublin called Bystrzyca and intersects the Łuków–Lublin railway line, which has a train station located right next to the street's level crossing called Lublin Zadębie, opened in 2013.

Turystyczna street primarily serves as a traffic artery (trunk route 86) and a commercial zone, for example there is a former pub called Budzyń, E.Leclerc hypermarket, Ford cars authorised dealer or Lublin Voivodeship road management headquarters.

== Public transport ==
The following city bus routes lead through the Turystyczna street:

- through the entire street: 2, 22
- through a section of the street: 57
