= Olszanka, Lublin County =

Olszanka
- Village
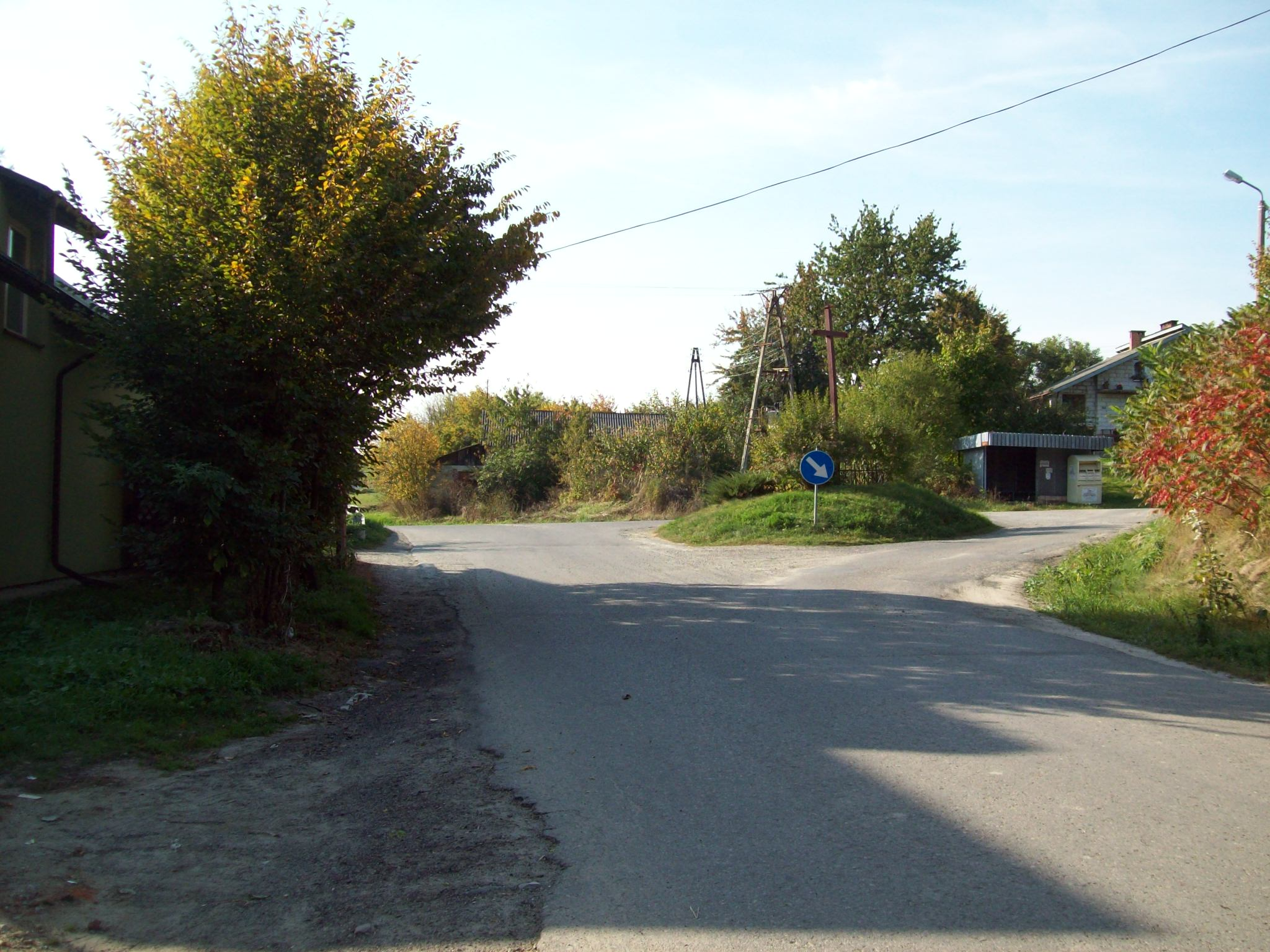

- Location within Poland
- Coordinates: 51°2′N 22°40′E
- Country: Poland
- Voivodeship: Lublin
- County: Lublin
- Gmina: Krzczonów

Population
  - Total: 313
- Time zone: UTC+1 (CET)
  - Summer (DST): UTC+2 (CEST)

Olszanka [ɔlˈʂaŋka] is a village in the administrative district of Gmina Krzczonów, within Lublin County, Lublin Voivodeship, in eastern Poland.

== History ==
Five Polish citizens were murdered by Nazi Germany in the village during World War II.
