= Stary Gaj, Lublin Voivodeship =

Stary Gaj
- Village
- Location within Poland
- Coordinates: 51°15′N 22°13′E
- Country: Poland
- Voivodeship: Lublin
- County: Lublin
- Gmina: Wojciechów

Stary Gaj (Polish pronunciation: [ˈstarɨ ˈɡaj]) is a village in the administrative district of Gmina Wojciechów, within Lublin County, Lublin Voivodeship, in eastern Poland. Through the village passes river Czerka.
