= Łagiewniki, Lublin Voivodeship =

Łagiewniki
- Village
- Location within Poland
- Coordinates: 51°17′56″N 22°36′13″E
- Country: Poland
- Voivodeship: Lublin
- County: Lublin
- Gmina: Niemce

Łagiewniki [waɡʲɛvˈniki] is a village in the administrative district of Gmina Niemce, within Lublin County, Lublin Voivodeship, in eastern Poland.
