= Osówka, Lublin Voivodeship =

Osówka
- Village
- Location within Poland
- Coordinates: 51°21′49″N 22°26′57″E
- Country: Poland
- Voivodeship: Lublin
- County: Lublin
- Gmina: Niemce

Osówka [ɔˈsufka] is a village in the administrative district of Gmina Niemce, within Lublin County, Lublin Voivodeship, in eastern Poland.
