= Rezerwa, Lublin Voivodeship =

Rezerwa
- Village
- Location within Poland
- Coordinates: 50°53′21″N 22°45′44″E
- Country: Poland
- Voivodeship: Lublin
- County: Lublin
- Gmina: Wysokie

Rezerwa [rɛˈzɛrva] is a village in the administrative district of Gmina Wysokie, within Lublin County, Lublin Voivodeship, in eastern Poland.
