= Kawka, Lublin Voivodeship =

Kawka
- Village
- Location within Poland
- Coordinates: 51°23′12″N 22°28′11″E
- Country: Poland
- Voivodeship: Lublin
- County: Lublin
- Gmina: Niemce

Kawka [ˈkafka] is a village in the administrative district of Gmina Niemce, within Lublin County, Lublin Voivodeship, in eastern Poland.
