= Nowy Dwór, Lublin County =

Nowy Dwór
- Village
- Location within Poland
- Coordinates: 50°52′41″N 22°41′28″E
- Country: Poland
- Voivodeship: Lublin
- County: Lublin
- Gmina: Wysokie

Nowy Dwór [ˈnɔvɨ ˈdvur] is a village in the administrative district of Gmina Wysokie, within Lublin County, Lublin Voivodeship, in eastern Poland.
