= Gierniak =

- Village
- Location within Poland
- Coordinates: 50°59′N 22°41′E
- Country: Poland
- Voivodeship: Lublin
- County: Lublin
- Gmina: Krzczonów

Gierniak [ˈɡʲɛrɲak] is a village in the administrative district of Gmina Krzczonów, within Lublin County, Lublin Voivodeship, in eastern Poland.
