= DYS =

DYS may relate to the following:

- DYS (band)
- Dys, Poland
- the 3-letter abbreviation for Dystos, a Greek municipality
