= Pólko, Lublin County =

Pólko
- Village
- Location within Poland
- Coordinates: 51°19′54″N 22°33′24″E
- Country: Poland
- Voivodeship: Lublin
- County: Lublin
- Gmina: Niemce

Pólko [ˈpulkɔ] is a village in the administrative district of Gmina Niemce, within Lublin County, Lublin Voivodeship, in eastern Poland.
