= Żuków Pierwszy =

- Village
- Location within Poland
- Coordinates: 51°02′04″N 22°46′02″E
- Country: Poland
- Voivodeship: Lublin
- County: Lublin
- Gmina: Krzczonów

Żuków Pierwszy [ˈʐukuf ˈpjɛrfʂɨ] is a village in the administrative district of Gmina Krzczonów, within Lublin County, Lublin Voivodeship, in eastern Poland. Żuków Pierwszy uses Central European Summer Time.
