= Krzczonów Drugi =

- Village
- Location within Poland
- Coordinates: 50°58′00″N 22°43′37″E
- Country: Poland
- Voivodeship: Lublin
- County: Lublin
- Gmina: Krzczonów

Krzczonów Drugi [ˈkʂt͡ʂɔnuf ˈdruɡi] is a village in the administrative district of Gmina Krzczonów, within Lublin County, Lublin Voivodeship, in eastern Poland.
