= Stoczek, Lublin County =

Stoczek
- Village
- Location within Poland
- Coordinates: 51°22′1″N 22°29′39″E
- Country: Poland
- Voivodeship: Lublin
- County: Lublin
- Gmina: Niemce

Stoczek [ˈstɔt͡ʂɛk] is a village in the administrative district of Gmina Niemce, within Lublin County, Lublin Voivodeship, in eastern Poland.
