= Kajetanów, Lublin County =

Kajetanów
- Village
- Location within Poland
- Coordinates: 50°57′03″N 22°38′08″E
- Country: Poland
- Voivodeship: Lublin
- County: Lublin
- Gmina: Wysokie

Kajetanów [kajɛˈtanuf] is a village in the administrative district of Gmina Wysokie, within Lublin County, Lublin Voivodeship, in eastern Poland.
