= Karol Ziemski =

Polish army general (1895–1974)

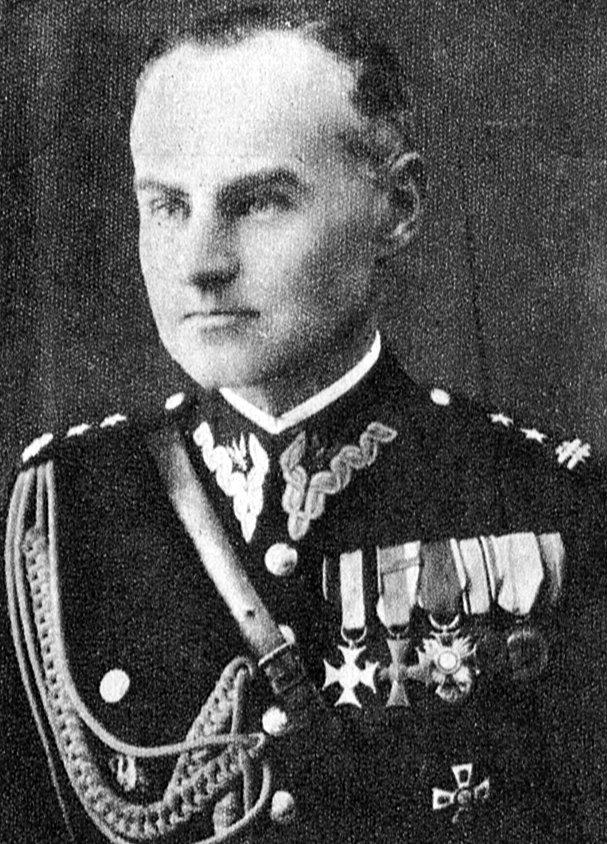
Karol Ziemski

Karol Ziemski (24 May 1895 – 17 January 1974) (nom de guerre Wachnowski) was a general of the Polish Army, participant of the Polish September Campaign and the Warsaw Uprising, officer of the Home Army.

He was born on May 24, 1895, in the village of Nasutów, in the Lublin Governorate of Congress Poland. In June 1914, Ziemski graduated from a high school in Lublin, and next year he was drafted into the Russian Imperial Army and was sent to a cadet school in Kiev. After graduation, he fought in Ukraine and Romania, and in January 1918 he got to Babruysk, where he joined the Polish I Corps in Russia, under general Józef Dowbor-Muśnicki.

In June 1918 Ziemski returned to Poland and began studies at the Warsaw Polytechnic. Soon afterward he quit to volunteer in the freshly created Polish Army. He co-organized the Warsaw Battalion of Academic Legion, and in 1919 was promoted to captain. Ziemski fought in the Polish-Soviet War, during which he was wounded. In 1923 promoted to captain, he served in the Corps District in Warsaw. Then he taught at a cadet school in Rembertów and in the Center of Infantry in Warsaw.

During the Polish September Campaign, he was commandant of the 36th Infantry Regiment in the 28th Infantry Division of the Łódź Army. Awarded the Virtuti Militari for defense of Modlin, during which he was wounded, Ziemski was taken to a German POW camp in Działdowo, from where he was released because of his injuries. After returning to Warsaw, he became engaged in the Polish underground resistance (see: Home Army). During the Warsaw Uprising, Ziemski was commandant of Group North of the Home Army, which covered units fighting in Warsaw's Old Town, Marymont and Żoliborz. On September 5, 1944, he was named deputy of Antoni Chrusciel and participated in talks with the Germans. After the Uprising, he stayed in different German POW camps, in May 1945 was freed by the Allies and settled in London, where he was a member of the Polish Government in Exile. He died January 17, 1974, in London.

== Honours and awards ==
- Cross of Valor, three times (including 1921 and September 28, 1944)
- Knight's Cross of the Virtuti Militari (August 28, 1944, "for courage shown in the battle for Warsaw, in particular the heroic defense of the Old Town."); previously awarded the Gold Cross twice (29 September 1939 and 18 August 1944) and the Silver Cross (1921)
- Gold Cross of Merit with Swords (1925)
- Knight's Cross of the Order of Polonia Restituta (1937)

== Sources ==
- Tadeusz Kryska-Karski i Stanisław Zurakowski, Generalowie Polski Niepodleglej, Editions Spotkania, Warszawa 1991, wyd. II uzup. i poprawione.

== See also ==
- Polish contribution to World War II
