= Ignaców, Lublin County =

Ignaców
- Village
- Location within Poland
- Coordinates: 51°13′N 22°15′E
- Country: Poland
- Voivodeship: Lublin
- County: Lublin
- Gmina: Wojciechów

Ignaców [iɡˈnat͡suf] is a village in the administrative district of Gmina Wojciechów, within Lublin County, Lublin Voivodeship, in eastern Poland.
