= Skorek =

Skorek is a surname. Notable people with the surname include:

- Adam Skorek (born 1956), Canadian University professor and Polish engineer
- Edward Skorek (born 1943), Polish volleyball player
