= Zalesie, Gmina Niemce =

Zalesie
- Village
- Location within Poland
- Coordinates: 51°22′6″N 22°37′30″E
- Country: Poland
- Voivodeship: Lublin
- County: Lublin
- Gmina: Niemce
- Area Code: (+48) 81
- Vehicle registration: LUB

Zalesie [zaˈlɛɕɛ] is a village in the administrative district of Gmina Niemce, within Lublin County, Lublin Voivodeship, in eastern Poland.
