= Swoboda, Lublin Voivodeship =

Swoboda
- Village
- Location within Poland
- Coordinates: 51°19′58″N 22°41′5″E
- Country: Poland
- Voivodeship: Lublin
- County: Lublin
- Gmina: Niemce

Swoboda [sfɔˈbɔda] is a village in the administrative district of Gmina Niemce, within Lublin County, Lublin Voivodeship, in eastern Poland.
