= Wojciechów-Kolonia Piąta =

- Village
- Location within Poland
- Coordinates: 51°14′28″N 22°14′34″E
- Country: Poland
- Voivodeship: Lublin
- County: Lublin
- Gmina: Wojciechów

Wojciechów-Kolonia Piąta (Polish pronunciation: [vɔjˈt͡ɕɛxuf kɔˈlɔɲa ˈpjɔnta]) is a village in the administrative district of Gmina Wojciechów, within Lublin County, Lublin Voivodeship, in eastern Poland.
