= Nowy Maciejów =

- Village
- Location within Poland
- Coordinates: 50°53′43″N 22°44′58″E
- Country: Poland
- Voivodeship: Lublin
- County: Lublin
- Gmina: Wysokie

Nowy Maciejów [ˈnɔvɨ maˈt͡ɕɛjuf] is a village in the administrative district of Gmina Wysokie, within Lublin County, Lublin Voivodeship, in eastern Poland.
