= Słupeczno =

- Village
- Location within Poland
- Coordinates: 50°55′N 22°44′E
- Country: Poland
- Voivodeship: Lublin
- County: Lublin
- Gmina: Wysokie

Słupeczno [swuˈpɛt͡ʂnɔ] is a village in the administrative district of Gmina Wysokie, within Lublin County, Lublin Voivodeship, in eastern Poland.
