= Ludwinów, Gmina Niemce =

Ludwinów
- Village
- Location within Poland
- Coordinates: 51°19′29″N 22°37′17″E
- Country: Poland
- Voivodeship: Lublin
- County: Lublin
- Gmina: Niemce

Ludwinów [ludˈvinuf] is a village in the administrative district of Gmina Niemce, within Lublin County, Lublin Voivodeship, in eastern Poland.
