= Rudka Kozłowiecka =

- Village
- Location within Poland
- Coordinates: 51°22′N 22°35′E
- Country: Poland
- Voivodeship: Lublin
- County: Lublin
- Gmina: Niemce

Population
  - Total: 960

Rudka Kozłowiecka [ˈrutka kɔzwɔˈvjɛt͡ska] is a village in the administrative district of Gmina Niemce, within Lublin County, Lublin Voivodeship, in eastern Poland.
