= Giełczew-Doły =

- Village
- Location within Poland
- Coordinates: 50°56′56″N 22°43′01″E
- Country: Poland
- Voivodeship: Lublin
- County: Lublin
- Gmina: Wysokie

Population
  - Total: 123

Giełczew-Doły [ˈɡʲɛu̯t͡ʂɛf ˈdɔwɨ] is a village in the administrative district of Gmina Wysokie, within Lublin County, Lublin Voivodeship, in eastern Poland.
