= Świdnik Duży =

- Village
- Location within Poland
- Coordinates: 51°15′N 22°41′E
- Country: Poland
- Voivodeship: Lublin
- County: Lublin
- Gmina: Wólka

Population (2009)
  - Total: 681

Świdnik Duży [ˈɕfidnik ˈduʐɨ] is a village in the administrative district of Gmina Wólka, within Lublin County, Lublin Voivodeship, in eastern Poland.
