= Walentynów, Lublin County =

Walentynów
- Village
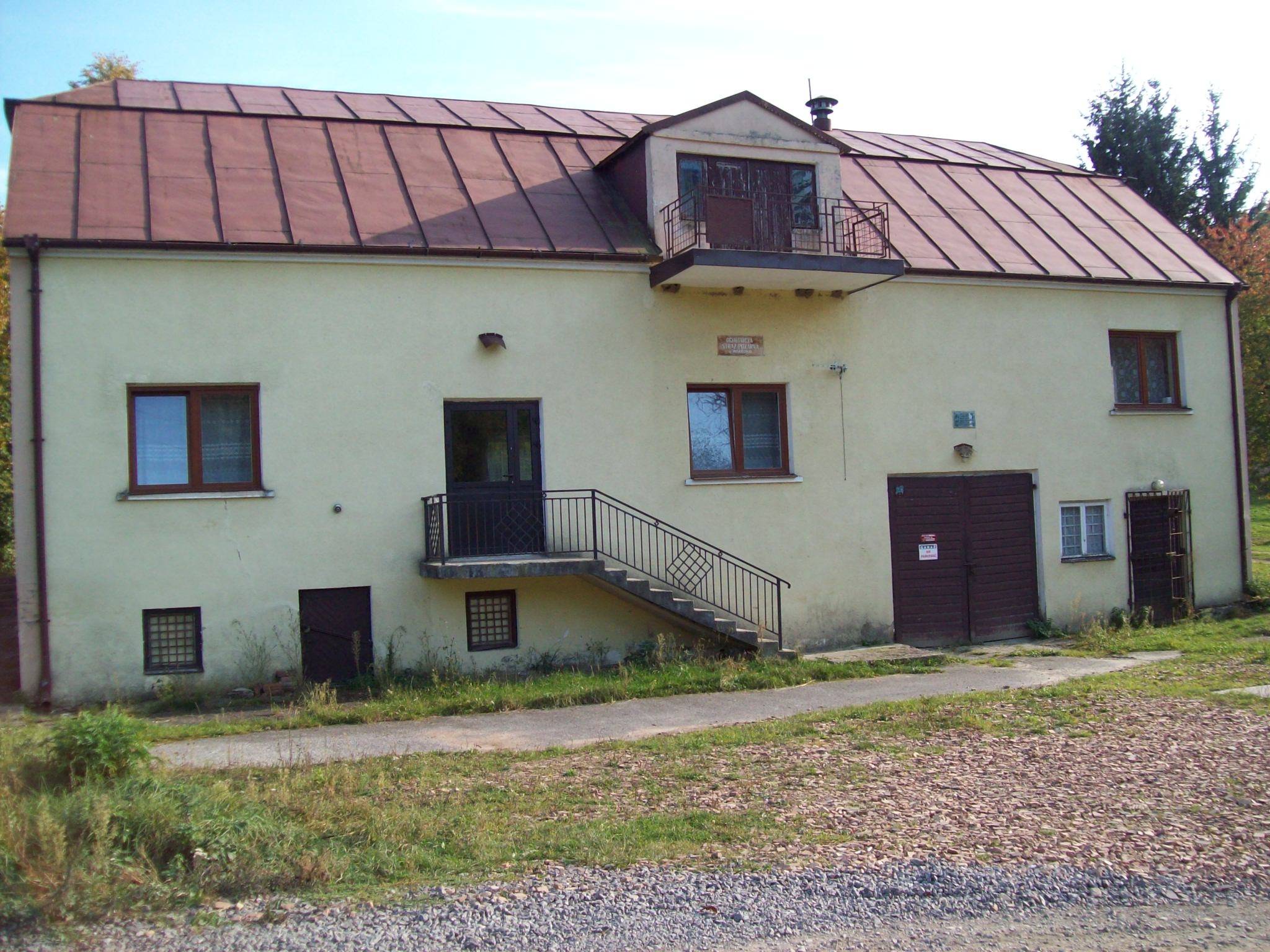

- Location within Poland
- Coordinates: 51°00′29″N 22°46′39″E
- Country: Poland
- Voivodeship: Lublin
- County: Lublin
- Gmina: Krzczonów

Walentynów [valɛnˈtɨnuf] is a village in the administrative district of Gmina Krzczonów, within Lublin County, Lublin Voivodeship, in eastern Poland.
