= Radomirka =

- Village
- Location within Poland
- Coordinates: 50°57′03″N 22°44′41″E
- Country: Poland
- Voivodeship: Lublin
- County: Lublin
- Gmina: Wysokie

Radomirka [radɔˈmirka] is a village in the administrative district of Gmina Wysokie, within Lublin County, Lublin Voivodeship, in eastern Poland.
