= Giełczew, Lublin County =

Giełczew
- Village
- Location within Poland
- Coordinates: 50°57′24″N 22°40′43″E
- Country: Poland
- Voivodeship: Lublin
- County: Lublin
- Gmina: Wysokie

Population
  - Total: 1,100

Giełczew [ˈɡʲɛu̯t͡ʂɛf] is a village in the administrative district of Gmina Wysokie, within Lublin County, Lublin Voivodeship, in eastern Poland.
