= Nowiny Żukowskie =

- Village
- Location within Poland
- Coordinates: 51°04′05″N 22°44′21″E
- Country: Poland
- Voivodeship: Lublin
- County: Lublin
- Gmina: Krzczonów

Nowiny Żukowskie [nɔˈvinɨ ʐuˈkɔfskʲɛ] is a village in the administrative district of Gmina Krzczonów, within Lublin County, Lublin Voivodeship, in eastern Poland.
