= Nowy Staw, Lublin Voivodeship =

Nowy Staw
- Village
- Location within Poland
- Coordinates: 51°23′5″N 22°33′37″E
- Country: Poland
- Voivodeship: Lublin
- County: Lublin
- Gmina: Niemce

Nowy Staw [ˈnɔvɨ ˈstaf] is a village in the administrative district of Gmina Niemce, within Lublin County, Lublin Voivodeship, in eastern Poland.
