= Leonów, Lublin County =

Leonów
- Village
- Location within Poland
- Coordinates: 51°20′54″N 22°37′38″E
- Country: Poland
- Voivodeship: Lublin
- County: Lublin
- Gmina: Niemce

Population
  - Total: 340

Leonów [lɛˈɔnuf] is a village in the administrative district of Gmina Niemce, within Lublin County, Lublin Voivodeship, in eastern Poland.
