= Nowy Gaj, Lublin Voivodeship =

Nowy Gaj
- Village
- Location within Poland
- Coordinates: 51°15′43″N 22°13′46″E
- Country: Poland
- Voivodeship: Lublin
- County: Lublin
- Gmina: Wojciechów

Population
  - Total: 60

Nowy Gaj (Polish pronunciation: [ˈnɔvɨ ˈɡaj]) is a village in the administrative district of Gmina Wojciechów, within Lublin County, Lublin Voivodeship, in eastern Poland.
