= Szczuczki =

- Village
- Location within Poland
- Coordinates: 51°13′N 22°13′E
- Country: Poland
- Voivodeship: Lublin
- County: Lublin
- Gmina: Wojciechów
- Time zone: UTC+1 (CET)
  - Summer (DST): UTC+2 (CEST)
- Vehicle registration: LUB

Szczuczki [ˈʂt͡ʂut͡ʂki] is a village in the administrative district of Gmina Wojciechów, within Lublin County, Lublin Voivodeship, in eastern Poland.

== History ==
In September 1939, during the German invasion of Poland at the start of World War II, the village was a site of a massacre of approximately 100 Poles by the German forces (the Szczuczki massacre).
