= Ciecierzyn =

Ciecierzyn may refer to the following places:

- Ciecierzyn, Lublin Voivodeship (east Poland)
- Ciecierzyn, Lubusz Voivodeship (west Poland)
- Ciecierzyn, Opole Voivodeship (south-west Poland)
