= Łubki, Lublin Voivodeship =

Łubki
- Village
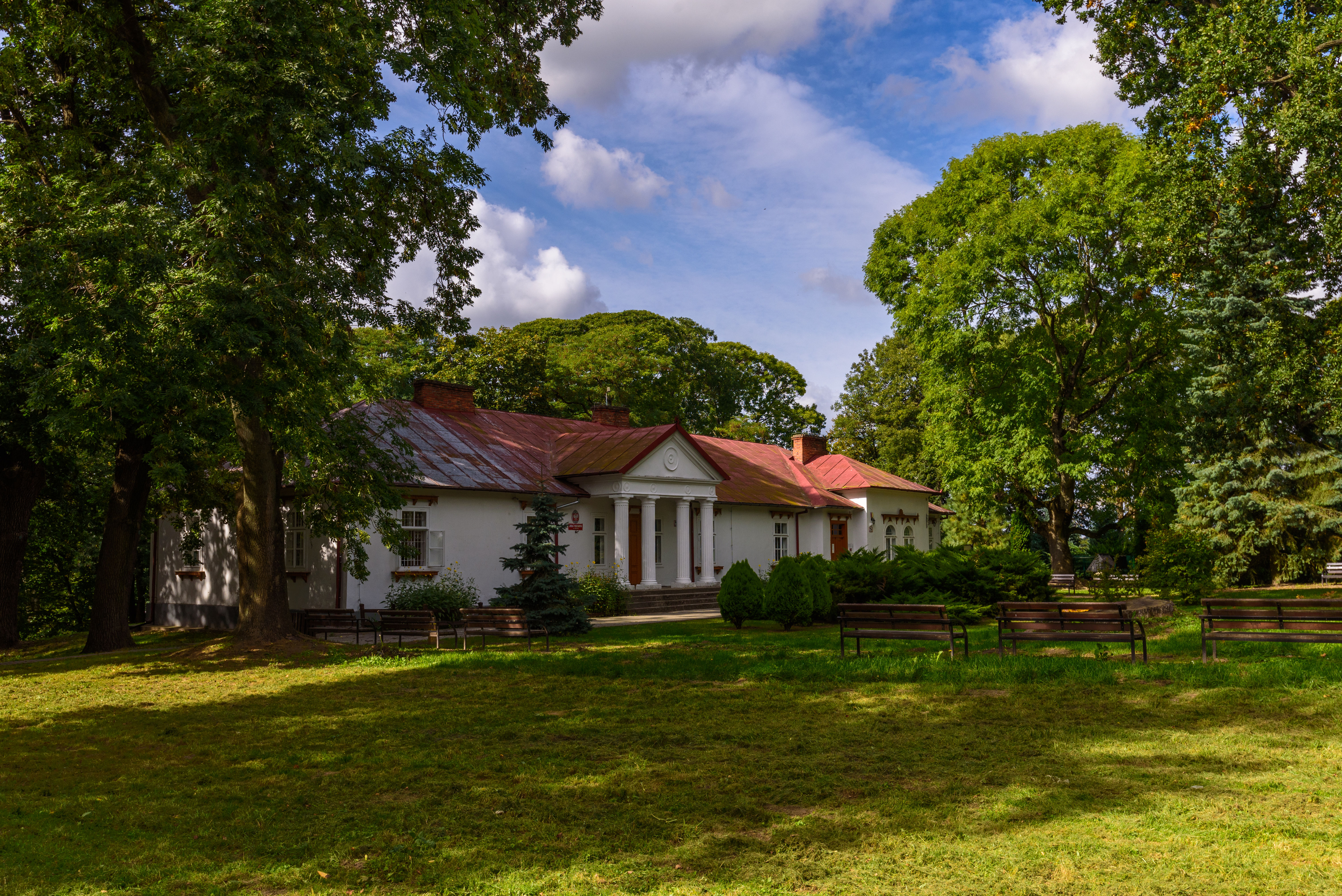

- Location within Poland
- Coordinates: 51°15′N 22°11′E
- Country: Poland
- Voivodeship: Lublin
- County: Lublin
- Gmina: Wojciechów
- Time zone: UTC+1 (CET)
  - Summer (DST): UTC+2 (CEST)

Łubki [ˈwupki] is a village in the administrative district of Gmina Wojciechów, within Lublin County, Lublin Voivodeship, in eastern Poland.

== History ==
Three Polish citizens were murdered by Nazi Germany in the village during World War II.
