= Niemce =

- Village
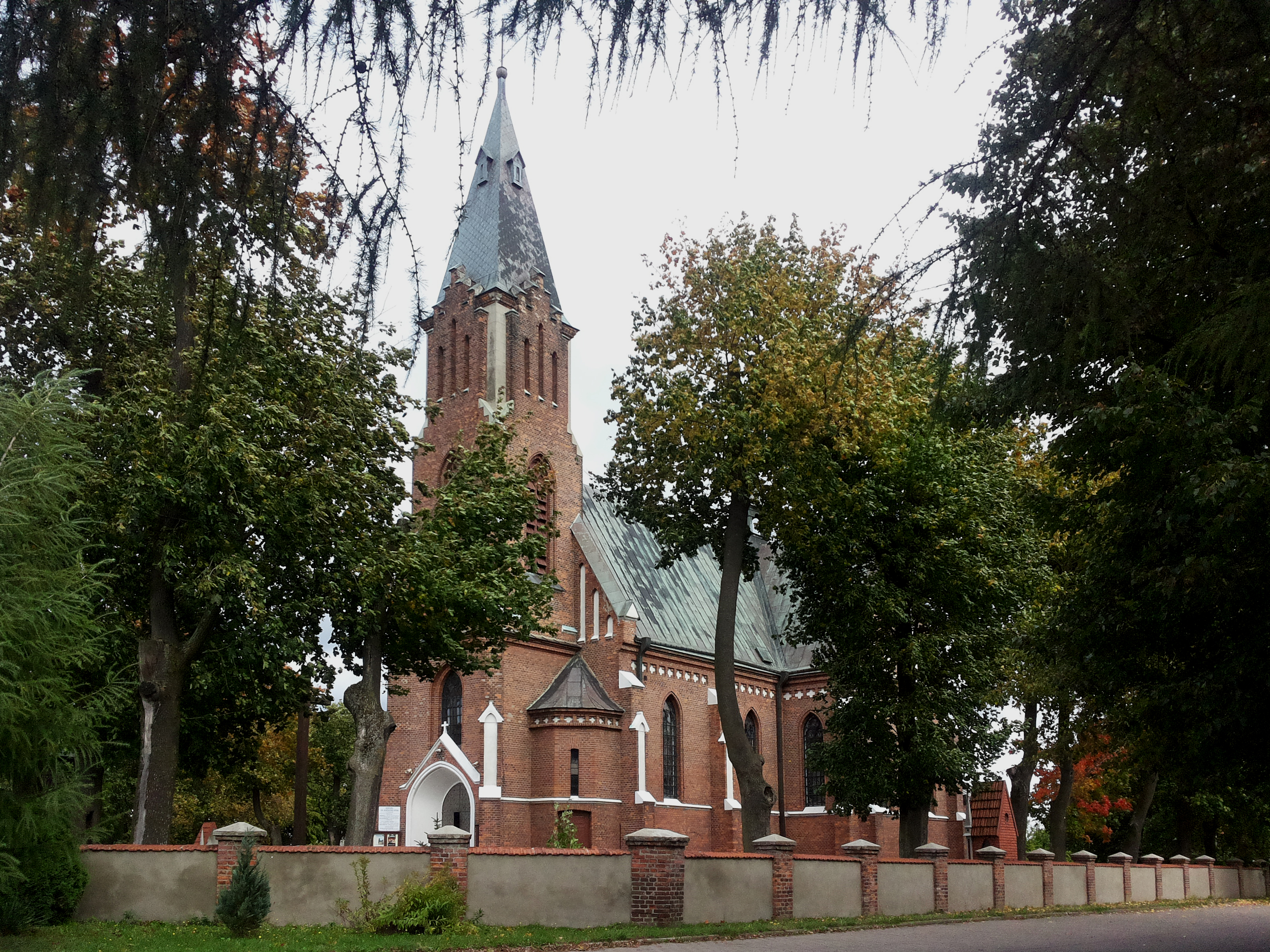
- Church of Saint Ignatius of Loyola

- Location within Poland
- Coordinates: 51°21′33″N 22°37′48″E
- Country: Poland
- Voivodeship: Lublin
- County: Lublin
- Gmina: Niemce

Population
  - Total: 3,692
- Postal Code: 21-025
- Area Code: (+48) 81
- Vehicle registration: LUB
- Website: www.niemce.pl

Niemce [ˈɲɛmt͡sɛ] is a village in Lublin County, Lublin Voivodeship, in eastern Poland. It is the seat of the gmina (administrative district) called Gmina Niemce.

In 2021 the village had a population of 3,692.
