= Biskupie-Kolonia, Gmina Wysokie =

Biskupie-Kolonia
- Village
- Location within Poland
- Coordinates: 50°51′33″N 22°37′3″E
- Country: Poland
- Voivodeship: Lublin
- County: Lublin
- Gmina: Wysokie

Biskupie-Kolonia [bisˈkupjɛ kɔˈlɔɲa] is a village in the administrative district of Gmina Wysokie, within Lublin County, Lublin Voivodeship, in eastern Poland.
