= Adam Skorek =

Polish-Canadian engineer and professor (born 1956)

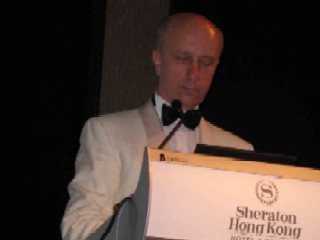
Skorek in 2005

Adam Waldemar Skorek (December 24, 1956) is a Canadian engineer and professor of Polish origin who is a professor at the Université du Québec à Trois-Rivières (UQTR).

== Education ==
Skorek was born in Krzczonów, Lublin, Poland. He completed a Master of Science in the Electrical Engineering Program at Białystok Technical University receiving both a Master of Science and Engineer degree in 1980. His Ph.D. degree in Electrical Engineering was received at Warsaw University of Technology in 1983.

== Career ==
Skorek is a Full Professor and Former Head of the Electrical and Computer Engineering Department at the Université du Québec à Trois-Rivières. He was elected Director of the UQTR's Research Group on Industrial Electronics (1995–2001). He is a visiting professor at the Faculty of Management at the Białystok Technical University. Elected by professors, he was nominated by the Council of Ministers as a member of the Board of Directors of the UQTR (2008–2011) as well a member of the Board of Governors of the University of Quebec (2011–2014).

== Works ==
His works include supercomputers applications to the electro-thermal applications and complex problems solutions in industrial environment. More specifically he worked on numerical algorithms with the use of parallel computing for the analysis of the thermal problems in electrical, electronics and nanoelectronics devices.

He has made contributions to the numerical analysis of electro-thermal phenomena exploring and applying various techniques to the power electronics devices design and industrial process control. This contribution is reflected in the number of papers published and presented in journals and conferences.

== Memberships and organizations ==
Skorek is an active Fellow Member of the Institute of Electrical and Electronics Engineers (IEEE). His IEEE implications includes membership of the IEEE MGA Awards and Recognition Committee (2015–2016), IEEE Awards Board (2013–2014 and 2008–2009), IEEE Medal of Honor Committee (2008–2009) and the Industry Applications Society Executive Board (2005–2008 and 2001–2003) as well Chairs of the IEEE MGA Awards and Recognition Committee (2013–2014), the St-Maurice Section (2003–2004 and 1992–1994), Education Society Chapters Committee (1997–2001), Eastern Canada Council and Education Activities Committee of the IEEE Canada. He is a co-founder of the PARELEC IEEE International Conference dedicated to parallel computing applications in electrical engineering.

He is the Member of the Association of Polish Electrical Engineers (SEP) and the Member of the Polish Association of Production Management (PTZP).

Adam Skorek was appointed as Head of his Department (2001–2007) and elected by his Colleagues as Chair of the Canadian Heads and Chairs of Electrical Engineering Departments Network (2004). He was a member (2001–2007) of both the Canadian Heads and Chairs of Electrical Engineering Departments network (CHECE) and the Electrical and Computer Engineering Departments Heads Association (ECEDHA), providing Canadian representation as a member of ECEDHA's Board of Directors (2004).

He was elected president of the Canadian Polish Congress Quebec District (2015–2017). He was also a member of the Board of Directors of the Polish Institute of Arts and Sciences in Canada (1994–2009).

== Awards and recognition ==
- Recipient of the Knight's Cross of the Order of Merit of the Republic of Poland, awarded by the President of the Republic of Poland (2015)
- Recipient of the Medal of Governors of the University of Quebec (2014)
- Elected Full Member of the Academy of Engineering in Poland (2013)
- Recipient of the Queen Elizabeth II Diamond Jubilee Medal (2012)
- Elected Fellow of the Institute of Electrical and Electronics Engineers (IEEE) in 2009
- Recipient of the 2006 IEEE RAB Leadership Award "In recognition of his dynamic leadership and significant contributions in promoting IEEE and the engineering profession"
- Recipient of the 2005 IEEE Canada Wallace S. Read Outstanding Service Award "In recognition of service to the profession and to the society"
- Recipient of the Gold Cross of the Order of Merit, awarded by the President of the Republic of Poland (2004)
- Elected Fellow of the Engineering Institute of Canada in 2004

== Family ==
His wife Marzena Skorek died at the age of 56 on December 31, 2016, she was an architect. Married in 1980, they had two children.
