= Gmina Niemce =

Gmina Niemce Niemce Commune
- Gmina
- Coat of arms
- Interactive map of Gmina Niemce
- Coordinates (Niemce): 51°21′33″N 22°37′48″E
- Country: Poland
- Voivodeship: Lublin
- County: Lublin County
- Seat: Niemce

Area
  - Total: 141.16 km^{2} (54.50 sq mi)

Population (2019)
  - Total: 19,652
  - Density: 139.22/km^{2} (360.57/sq mi)
- Website: http://www.niemce.pl

Gmina Niemce is a rural gmina (administrative district) in Lublin County, Lublin Voivodeship, in eastern Poland. Its seat is the village of Niemce, which lies approximately 14 kilometres (9 mi) north of the regional capital Lublin.

The gmina covers an area of 141.16 square kilometres (54.5 sq mi), and as of 2019 its total population is 19,652.

== Villages ==
Gmina Niemce contains the villages and settlements of Baszki, Boduszyn, Bystrzyca-Kolonia, Ciecierzyn, Dys, Dziuchów, Elizówka, Jakubowice Konińskie, Jakubowice Konińskie-Kolonia, Kawka, Krasienin, Krasienin-Kolonia, Łagiewniki, Leonów, Ludwinów, Majdan Krasieniński, Nasutów, Niemce, Nowy Staw, Osówka, Pólko, Pryszczowa Góra, Rudka Kozłowiecka, Stoczek, Stoczek-Kolonia, Swoboda, Wola Krasienińska, Wola Niemiecka and Zalesie.

== Neighbouring gminas ==
Gmina Niemce is bordered by the city of Lublin and by the gminas of Garbów, Jastków, Kamionka, Lubartów, Spiczyn and Wólka.
