= Gmina Wólka =

Gmina Wólka Wólka Commune
- Gmina
- Coat of arms
- Interactive map of Gmina Wólka
- Coordinates (Jakubowice Murowane): 51°17′N 22°38′E
- Country: Poland
- Voivodeship: Lublin
- County: Lublin County
- Seat: Jakubowice Murowane

Area
  - Total: 72.65 km^{2} (28.05 sq mi)

Population (2019)
  - Total: 12,394
  - Density: 170.6/km^{2} (441.8/sq mi)
- Website: http://www.wolka.pl

Gmina Wólka is a rural gmina (administrative district) in Lublin County, Lublin Voivodeship, in eastern Poland. It takes its name from the village of Wólka, which was the gmina seat until 30 December 1999. Since then the seat has been the village of Jakubowice Murowane (the gmina offices are in fact situated in part of that village which is administratively part of the city of Lublin).

The gmina covers an area of 72.65 square kilometres (28.1 sq mi), and as of 2019 its total population is 12,394.

== Villages ==
Gmina Wólka contains the villages and settlements of Biskupie-Kolonia, Bystrzyca, Długie, Jakubowice Murowane, Kolonia Pliszczyn, Kolonia Świdnik Mały, Łuszczów Drugi, Łuszczów Pierwszy, Łysaków, Pliszczyn, Rudnik, Sobianowice, Świdniczek, Świdnik Duży, Świdnik Mały, Turka and Wólka.

== Neighbouring gminas ==
Gmina Wólka is bordered by the towns of Lublin and Świdnik, and by the gminas of Łęczna, Mełgiew, Niemce and Spiczyn.
