= Biskupie, Lublin Voivodeship =

Biskupie
- Village
- Location within Poland
- Coordinates: 50°51′57″N 22°38′35″E
- Country: Poland
- Voivodeship: Lublin
- County: Lublin
- Gmina: Wysokie

Biskupie [bisˈkupjɛ] is a village in the administrative district of Gmina Wysokie, within Lublin County, Lublin Voivodeship, in eastern Poland.
