= Wojciechów, Lublin County =

Wojciechów
- Village
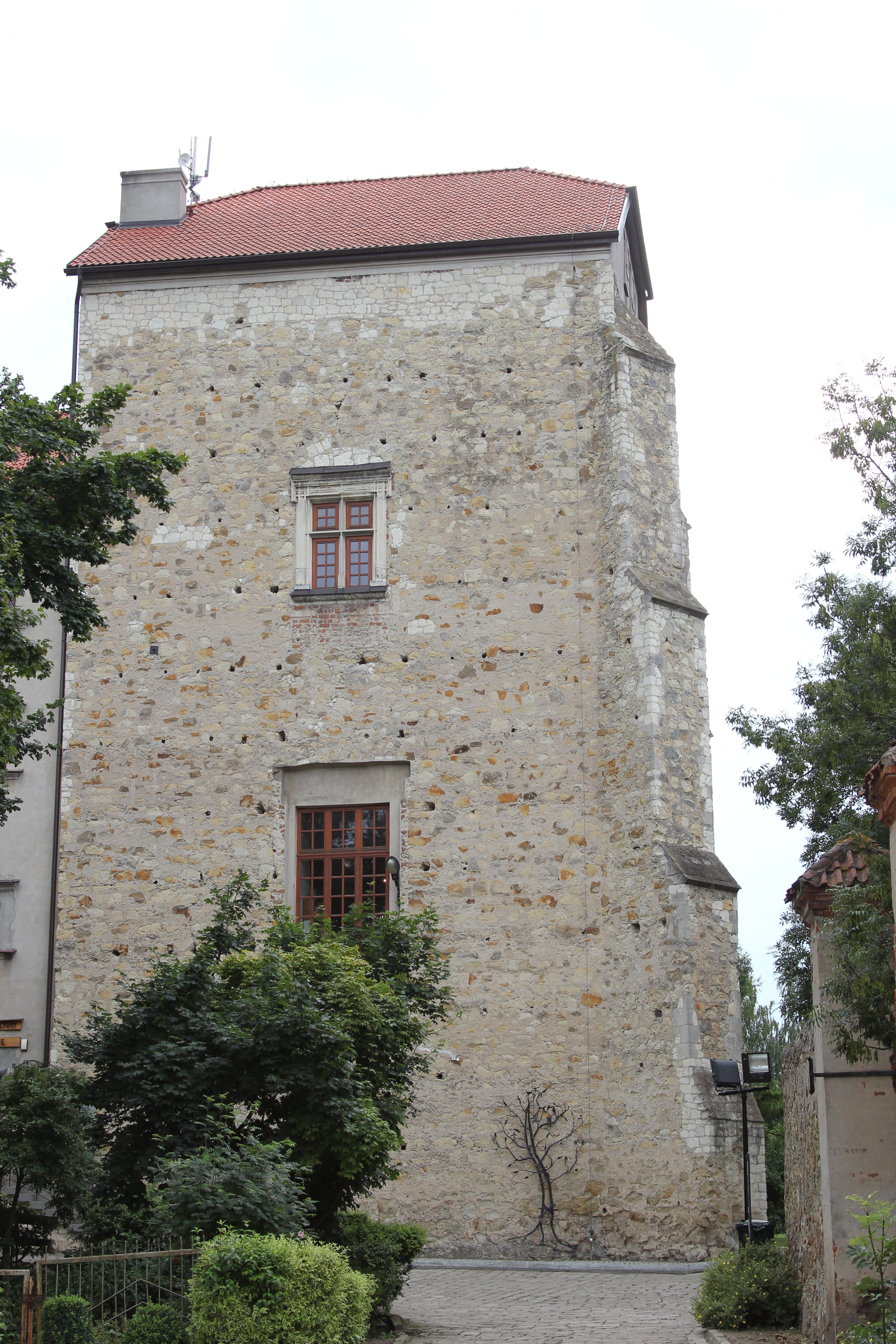
- Old tower castle, landmark of Wojciechów

- Location within Poland
- Coordinates: 51°14′8″N 22°14′41″E
- Country: Poland
- Voivodeship: Lublin
- County: Lublin
- Gmina: Wojciechów

Population
  - Total: 920
- Time zone: UTC+1 (CET)
  - Summer (DST): UTC+2 (CEST)
- Vehicle registration: LUB

Wojciechów (Polish pronunciation: [vɔjˈt͡ɕɛxuf]) is a village in Lublin County, Lublin Voivodeship, in eastern Poland. It is the seat of the gmina (administrative district) called Gmina Wojciechów.

== History ==
Historical population
Year	Pop.	±%
1883	807	—
1921	1,182	+46.5%

According to the 1921 Polish census, the population of was 99.2% Polish and 0.7% Jewish.

Following the German-Soviet invasion of Poland, which started World War II in September 1939, the village was occupied by Germany until 1944. In October 1943, the German gendarmerie and Ukrainian auxiliaries committed a massacre of 15 Jews and one Pole.
