= Jakubowice Murowane =

- Village
- Location within Poland
- Coordinates: 51°17′N 22°38′E
- Country: Poland
- Voivodeship: Lublin
- County: Lublin
- Gmina: Wólka

Population (2009)
  - Total: 259

Jakubowice Murowane [jakubɔˈvit͡sɛ murɔˈvanɛ] is a village in Lublin County, Lublin Voivodeship, in eastern Poland. It is the seat of the gmina (administrative district) called Gmina Wólka.
