= Miłocin, Gmina Wojciechów =

Miłocin
- Village
- Location within Poland
- Coordinates: 51°16′N 22°19′E
- Country: Poland
- Voivodeship: Lublin
- County: Lublin
- Gmina: Wojciechów

Miłocin [miˈwɔt͡ɕin] is a village in the administrative district of Gmina Wojciechów, within Lublin County, Lublin Voivodeship, in eastern Poland.
