= Wysokie, Gmina Wysokie =

Wysokie
- Village
- Location within Poland
- Coordinates: 50°54′28″N 22°39′54″E
- Country: Poland
- Voivodeship: Lublin
- County: Lublin
- Gmina: Wysokie

Population
  - Total: 602
- Website: http://www.wysokie.lubelskie.pl/

Wysokie [vɨˈsɔkʲɛ] is a village in Lublin County, Lublin Voivodeship, in eastern Poland. It is the seat of the gmina (administrative district) called Gmina Wysokie.

Between 500 and 700 Jews from the town were murdered during the Holocaust, and 320 Jews from Lublin were deported to Wysokie in March, 1941. This group, along with local Jews, were murdered in the gas chambers at Sobibór in May 1942. In April, 1942, 500 Jews from the town of Wysokie were deported to Turobin ghetto, from which they were sent to Sobibór extermination camp. Some Jews from nearby Turobin had been sent to Wysokie ghetto as well. In the fall of 1942, the remaining Jews in the town were sent to Izbica ghetto, from where they were sent to Bełżec extermination camp. The Jewish community ceased to exist.
