= Ciecierzyn, Lublin Voivodeship =

Ciecierzyn
- Village
- Location within Poland
- Coordinates: 51°19′9″N 22°36′25″E
- Country: Poland
- Voivodeship: Lublin
- County: Lublin
- Gmina: Niemce

Ciecierzyn [t͡ɕɛˈt͡ɕɛʐɨn] is a village in the administrative district of Gmina Niemce, within Lublin County, Lublin Voivodeship, in eastern Poland.
