= Łuszczów-Kolonia, Łęczna County =

Łuszczów-Kolonia
- Village
- Location within Poland
- Coordinates: 51°17′34″N 22°46′47″E
- Country: Poland
- Voivodeship: Lublin
- County: Łęczna
- Gmina: Łęczna
- Area: 4.3794 km^{2} (1.6909 sq mi)
- Population (2007): 290
  - Density: 66/km^{2} (170/sq mi)
- Time zone: UTC+1 (CET)
  - Summer (DST): UTC+2 (CEST)
- Postal code: 21-010 (Łęczna)
- Area code: +48 81
- Car plates: LLE

Łuszczów-Kolonia [ˈwuʂt͡ʂuf kɔˈlɔɲa] is a village in the administrative district of Gmina Łęczna, within Łęczna County, Lublin Voivodeship, in eastern Poland.

== See also ==
- Łuszczów-Kolonia, Hrubieszów County
- Łuszczów Pierwszy
- Łuszczów Drugi
