= Gmina Krzczonów =

Gmina Krzczonów Krzczonów Commune
- Gmina
- Interactive map of Gmina Krzczonów
- Coordinates (Krzczonów): 51°0′22″N 22°42′43″E
- Country: Poland
- Voivodeship: Lublin
- County: Lublin County
- Seat: Krzczonów

Area
  - Total: 128.15 km^{2} (49.48 sq mi)

Population (2019)
  - Total: 4,369
  - Density: 34.09/km^{2} (88.30/sq mi)
- Website: http://www.krzczonow.lubelskie.pl

Gmina Krzczonów is a rural gmina (administrative district) in Lublin County, Lublin Voivodeship, in eastern Poland. Its seat is the village of Krzczonów, which lies approximately 29 kilometres (18 mi) south of the regional capital Lublin.

The gmina covers an area of 128.15 square kilometres (49.5 sq mi), and as of 2019 its total population is 4,369 (4,650 in 2013).

== Villages ==
Gmina Krzczonów contains the villages and settlements of Antoniówka, Boży Dar, Gierniak, Kosarzew Dolny, Kosarzew Górny, Kosarzew-Stróża, Krzczonów, Krzczonów Drugi, Krzczonów Pierwszy, Krzczonów Trzeci, Krzczonów-Folwark, Krzczonów-Skałka, Lewandowszczyzna, Majdan Policki, Nowiny Żukowskie, Olszanka, Piotrkówek, Policzyzna, Pustelnik, Sobieska Wola Pierwsza, Sobieska Wola Druga, Teklin, Walentynów, Zielona, Żuków Drugi, Żuków Pierwszy and Żuków-Kolonia.

== Neighbouring gminas ==
Gmina Krzczonów is bordered by the gminas of Bychawa, Jabłonna, Piaski, Rybczewice, Wysokie and Żółkiewka.
