= Biskupie-Kolonia, Gmina Wólka =

Biskupie-Kolonia
- Village
- Location within Poland
- Coordinates: 51°15′45″N 22°39′48″E
- Country: Poland
- Voivodeship: Lublin
- County: Lublin
- Gmina: Wólka

Population (2014)
  - Total: 382

Biskupie-Kolonia [bisˈkupjɛ kɔˈlɔɲa] is a village in the administrative district of Gmina Wólka, within Lublin County, Lublin Voivodeship, in eastern Poland.
