= Gmina Wojciechów =

Gmina Wojciechów Wojciechów Commune
- Gmina
- Interactive map of Gmina Wojciechów
- Coordinates (Wojciechów): 51°14′8″N 22°14′41″E
- Country: Poland
- Voivodeship: Lublin
- County: Lublin County
- Seat: Wojciechów

Area
  - Total: 80.92 km^{2} (31.24 sq mi)

Population (2019)
  - Total: 5,977
  - Density: 73.86/km^{2} (191.3/sq mi)
- Website: https://web.archive.org/web/20070508232317/http://www.wojciechow.lubelskie.pl/

Gmina Wojciechów is a rural gmina (administrative district) in Lublin County, Lublin Voivodeship, in eastern Poland. Its seat is the village of Wojciechów, which lies approximately 23 kilometres (14 mi) west of the regional capital Lublin.

The gmina covers an area of 80.92 square kilometres (31.2 sq mi), and as of 2019 its total population is 5,977 (5,946 in 2013).

== Villages ==
Gmina Wojciechów contains the villages and settlements of Góra, Halinówka, Ignaców, Łubki, Łubki-Kolonia, Łubki-Szlachta, Maszki, Miłocin, Nowy Gaj, Palikije, Palikije Drugie, Sporniak, Stary Gaj, Stasin, Szczuczki, Tomaszówka, Wojciechów, Wojciechów-Kolonia Piąta and Wojciechów-Kolonia Pierwsza.

== Neighbouring gminas ==
Gmina Wojciechów is bordered by the gminas of Bełżyce, Jastków, Konopnica, Nałęczów, Poniatowa and Wąwolnica.
