= Dys =

- Village
- Location within Poland
- Coordinates: 51°19′N 22°34′E
- Country: Poland
- Voivodeship: Lublin
- County: Lublin
- Gmina: Niemce

Population
  - Total: 1,200

Dys [dɨs] is a village in the administrative district of Gmina Niemce, within Lublin County, Lublin Voivodeship, in eastern Poland.
