= Nasutów =

- Village
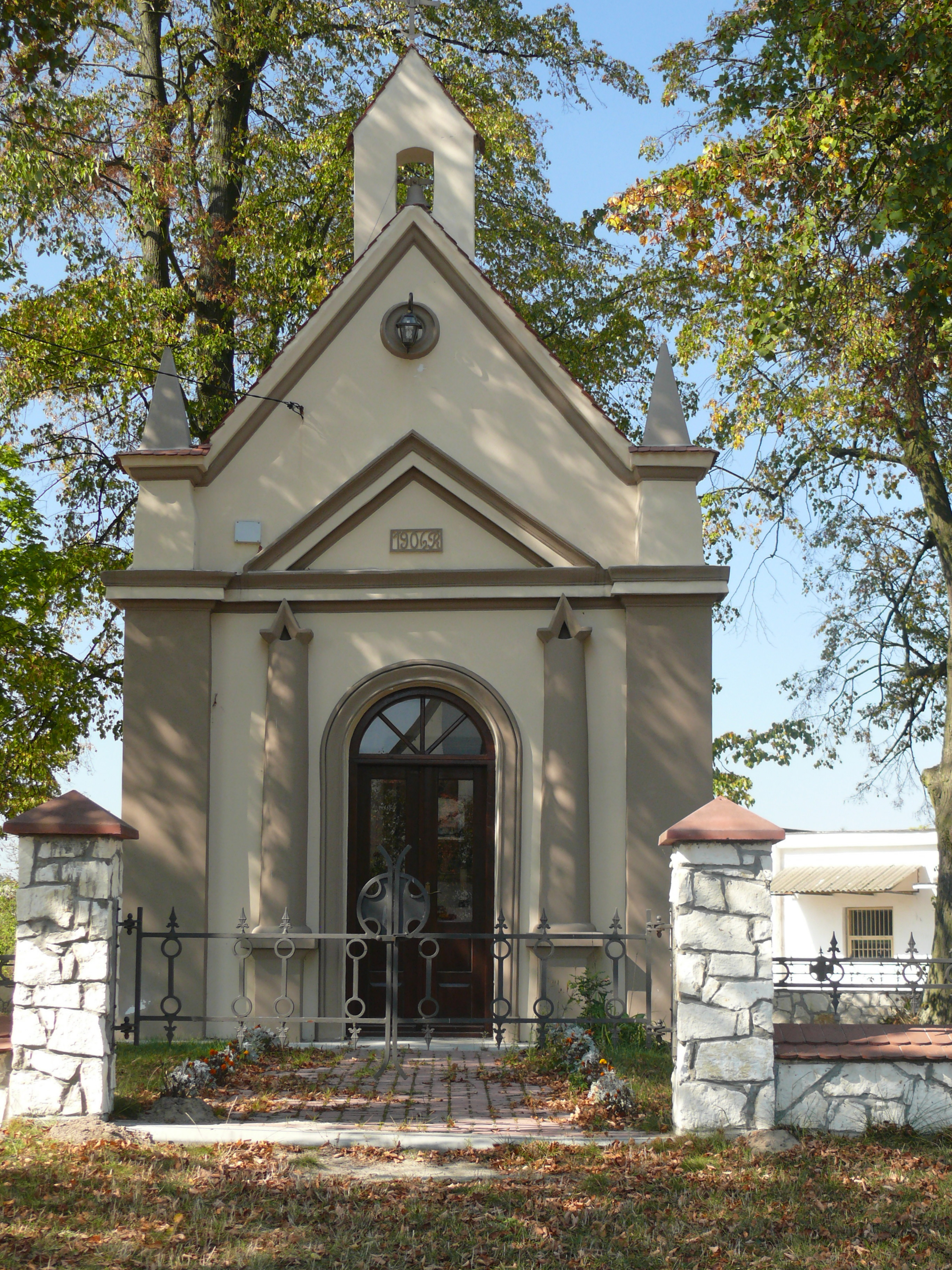
- Chapel in Nasutów

- Location within Poland
- Coordinates: 51°21′45″N 22°31′46″E
- Country: Poland
- Voivodeship: Lublin
- County: Lublin
- Gmina: Niemce
- Time zone: UTC+1 (CET)
  - Summer (DST): UTC+2 (CEST)

Nasutów [naˈsutuf] is a village in the administrative district of Gmina Niemce, within Lublin County, Lublin Voivodeship, in eastern Poland.

== History ==
16 Polish citizens were murdered by Nazi Germany in the village during World War II.
