= Miłocin, Podkarpackie Voivodeship =

Miłocin
- District of Rzeszów
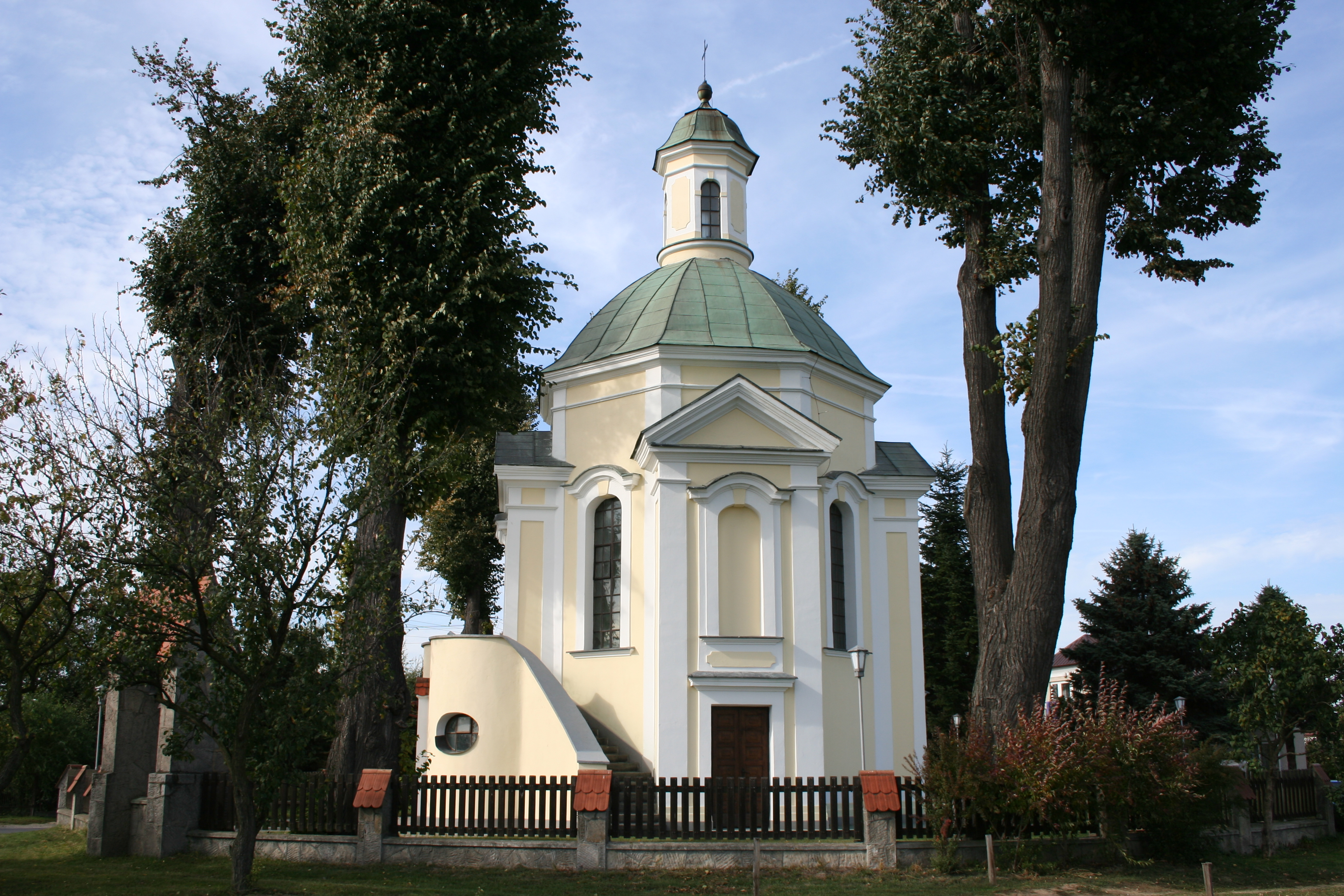
- Chapel of Saint Hubert

- Location within Poland Location within Subcarpathian Voivodeship
- Coordinates: 50°5′N 22°0′E
- Country: Poland
- Voivodeship: Subcarpathian
- County/City: Rzeszów
- Within city limits: 2010/2019
- Time zone: UTC+1 (CET)
  - Summer (DST): UTC+2 (CEST)
- Vehicle registration: RZ
- Primary airport: Rzeszów–Jasionka Airport

Miłocin [miˈwɔt͡ɕin] is a district of Rzeszów, Poland, located in the northern part of the city.

It was gradually included within the city limits of Rzeszów in 2010–2019. Earlier, it was a separate village, located in the administrative district of Gmina Głogów Małopolski, within Rzeszów County, Subcarpathian Voivodeship.
