= Krzczonów, Lublin Voivodeship =

Krzczonów
- Village
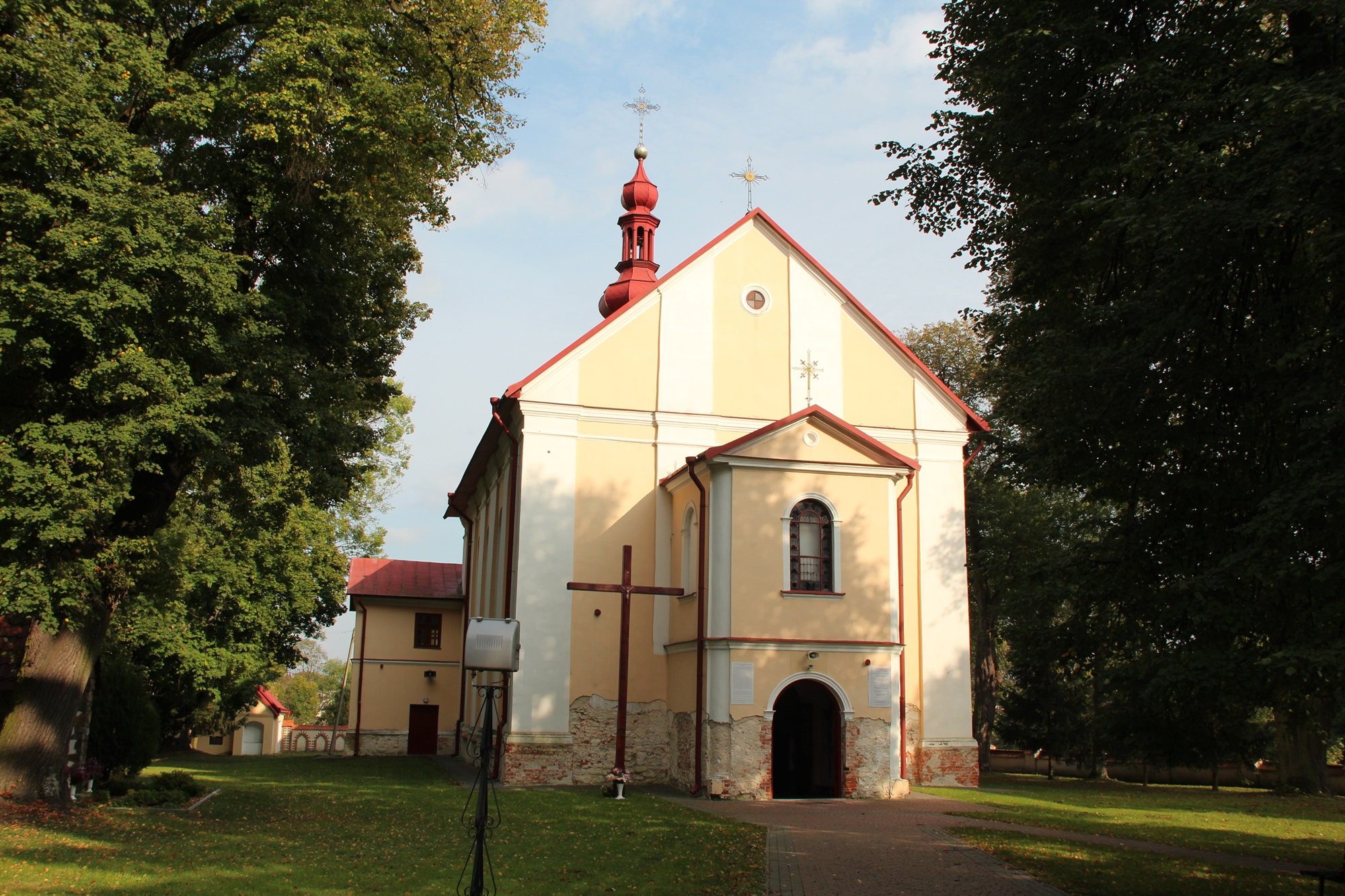
- Church of the Assumption of the Virgin Mary

- Location within Poland
- Coordinates: 51°0′22″N 22°42′43″E
- Country: Poland
- Voivodeship: Lublin
- County: Lublin
- Gmina: Krzczonów

Krzczonów [ˈkʂt͡ʂɔnuf] is a village in Lublin County, Lublin Voivodeship, in eastern Poland. It is the seat of the gmina (administrative district) called Gmina Krzczonów.

== Notable people ==
- Wojciech Siemion, Polish actor
