= Lublin County =

Lublin County Powiat lubelski
- County
- Flag Coat of arms

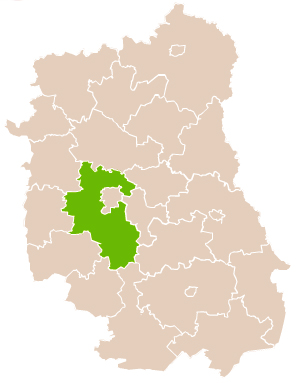
- Location within the voivodeship
- Coordinates (Lublin): 51°14′53″N 22°34′13″E
- Country: Poland
- Voivodeship: Lublin
- Seat: Lublin
- Gminas: Total 16: Gmina Bełżyce; Gmina Borzechów; Gmina Bychawa; Gmina Garbów; Gmina Głusk; Gmina Jabłonna; Gmina Jastków; Gmina Konopnica; Gmina Krzczonów; Gmina Niedrzwica Duża; Gmina Niemce; Gmina Strzyżewice; Gmina Wojciechów; Gmina Wólka; Gmina Wysokie; Gmina Zakrzew

Area
  - Total: 1,679.42 km^{2} (648.43 sq mi)

Population (2019)
  - Total: 154,760
  - Density: 92.151/km^{2} (238.67/sq mi)
  - Urban: 11,397
  - Rural: 143,363
- Car plates: LUB
- Website: powiat.lublin.pl

Lublin County (Polish: Powiat Lubelski) is a unit of territorial administration and local government (powiat) in Lublin Voivodeship, eastern Poland. It was established on January 1, 1999, as a result of the Polish local government reforms passed in 1998. Its administrative seat is the city of Lublin, although the city is not part of the county (it constitutes a separate city county). The only towns in Lublin County are Bełżyce, which lies 23 km (14 mi) west of Lublin, and Bychawa, 26 km (16 mi) south of Lublin.

The county covers an area of 1,679.42 square kilometres (648.4 sq mi). As of 2019, its total population is 154,760, out of which the population of Bełżyce is 6,504, that of Bychawa is 4,893, and the rural population is 143,363.

== Neighbouring counties ==
Apart from the city of Lublin, Lublin County is also bordered by Lubartów County to the north, Łęczna County, Świdnik County and Krasnystaw County to the east, Biłgoraj County and Janów County to the south, Kraśnik County to the south-west, and Opole County and Puławy County to the west.

== Administrative divisions ==
The county is subdivided into 16 gminas (two urban-rural and 14 rural). These are listed in the following table, in descending order of population.

Gmina	Type	Area (km^{2})	Population (2019)	Seat
Gmina Niemce	rural	141.2	19,652	Niemce
Gmina Jastków	rural	113.8	14,062	Jastków
Gmina Bełżyce	urban-rural	133.9	13,243	Bełżyce
Gmina Konopnica	rural	92.8	13,963	Konopnica
Gmina Wólka	rural	72.8	12,394	Jakubowice Murowane
Gmina Niedrzwica Duża	rural	106.8	11,906	Niedrzwica Duża
Gmina Bychawa	urban-rural	146.2	11,647	Bychawa
Gmina Głusk	rural	64.0	11,327	Głusk (Note: Głusk is now part of Lublin, but still serves as the administrative seat of Gmina Głusk)
Gmina Garbów	rural	102.4	9,063	Garbów
Gmina Strzyżewice	rural	108.8	8,078	Strzyżewice
Gmina Jabłonna	rural	131.0	8,044	Jabłonna
Gmina Wojciechów	rural	80.9	5,977	Wojciechów
Gmina Wysokie	rural	114.2	4,407	Wysokie
Gmina Krzczonów	rural	128.2	4,369	Krzczonów
Gmina Borzechów	rural	67.4	3,748	Borzechów
Gmina Zakrzew	rural	75.4	2,880	Zakrzew

== Lublin County in the Past ==
The history of Lublin County as a separate administrative unit dates back to the late 15th century, when Lublin Voivodeship was carved out of eastern part of Sandomierz Voivodeship. The new voivodeship was made of three counties - Urzędów County, Łuków County and Lublin County, which had the area of 5812 sq. kilometers (as for mid-16th century). Apart from Lublin, other towns of the county were Kazimierz Dolny, Lubartów, Wawolnica, Kurów, Łęczna, Końskowola, Bełżyce and Parczew. The exact boundary between Urzędów and Lublin counties is difficult to pin down, as it has varied in different centuries.

Lublin County existed in its original form until the 18th-century forced Partitions of Poland. It continued to exist also in the Duchy of Warsaw, Russian-controlled Congress Poland and Second Polish Republic, but its borders were subject to frequent changes, due to several administrative centers.
