= Lysolaje =

Lysolaje may refer to the following places:

- Łysołaje, a village in Lublin Voivodeship, Poland
- Łysołaje-Kolonia, a village in Lublin Voivodeship, Poland
- Lysolaje (Prague), a cadastral district of Prague, Czech Republic
