= Łysołaje-Kolonia =

- Village
- Location within Poland
- Coordinates: 51°11′16″N 22°55′08″E
- Country: Poland
- Voivodeship: Lublin
- County: Łęczna
- Gmina: Milejów
- Population (2021): 347
- Postal code: 21-020
- Area code: 81
- Vehicle registration: LLE

Łysołaje-Kolonia [wɨsɔˈwajɛ kɔˈlɔɲa] is a kolonia (a type of rural settlement) in the administrative district of Gmina Milejów, within Łęczna County, Lublin Voivodeship, in eastern Poland.

== Etymology ==
The first historical records refer to the village as "Lyssolaye" or "Lyssogaje". The name likely derives from two elements: "łyse" (bald/bare) and "gaj" (grove), suggesting the village was established in a cleared forest area. Alternatively, the name may come from "lyss" meaning fox. A similar etymology applies to the Czech village of Lysolaje (now part of Prague). Some historians suggest the name may have Ruthenian origins, given the village's relatively late appearance in records (mid-14th century) and its geographic location on the border between Polish and Ruthenian settlements.

== History ==
=== Medieval period ===
The area of present-day Łysołaje was originally uninhabited forest at the edge of a primeval woodland. The village is one of the oldest settlements in the current Milejów municipality. The first documented mention of Łysołaje dates to 1382, when the village "LYSSOLAYE" was owned by a nobleman named Prandota.

In 1417, the village became the property of Jan of Łańcuchów, the castellan of Zawichost. As a result, local peasants were assigned to the parish in Łańcuchów, and the village remained part of that parish at least until 1529. Jan Kuropatwa frequently pledged the village as collateral for loans.

Among the 15th-century inhabitants of peasant origin were Hleb and Daniła (1413) and Jan Krawiec (1460). These names suggest that a significant portion of the population was of Ruthenian and Orthodox origin. Although no records exist of a church in Łysołaje, a cerkiew (Orthodox church) existed in nearby Jaszczów from at least 1437, where local residents likely attended services.

The village was described as "villa in nova radix" (a village founded on virgin land), indicating it was established in a cleared forest area with no prior settlement.

=== 16th–18th centuries ===
A 1531 property survey of Lublin Voivodeship listed Łysołaje as part of the Łańcuchów parish, with 54 homesteads. This period was characterized by frequent changes in ownership. While Andrzej of Łysołaje co-financed the construction of a church in Biskupice in the mid-15th century, the Drewnowski family who owned the village in the 16th and 17th centuries were devoted followers of the Reformation. Later owners, the Zawadzki and Popławski families, were Roman Catholic.

During the construction of the brick church in Biskupice in the mid-18th century, a brick monument was erected outside the village at the site of an epidemic victims' cemetery, using leftover materials from the church construction. Limestone and opoka stone for the church were quarried from Łysołajska Góra (now part of the village of Popławy).

=== 19th century ===
In 1827, the village had a modest wooden manor house covered with shingles, approached by a linden avenue and surrounded by vegetable and fruit gardens. The village possessed numerous agricultural facilities, including a water mill, smithy, brickyard, and limestone quarry. The manor's cattle sheds were located in the area of present-day Cyganka village. The population had grown to 250 inhabitants, with forests still covering more than half the village area.

In the early 19th century, Łysołaje was owned by the Zawadzki family (coat of arms Rogala). After 1832, the village passed to the Popławski family, likely through marriage. Successive owners—Józef, Ludwik, and Tomasz August Popławski—expanded the palace and created a landscaped park. Tomasz August Popławski built a residence with a palace surrounded by a magnificent naturalistic landscape park, featuring terraces with views in all directions, a flower lawn with a driveway designed as a garden salon, ornamental plants, and a water reservoir.

=== 20th century ===
The first Polish census (1921) recorded 540 inhabitants in Łysołaje village (99% Polish) and 386 inhabitants in the manor farm (68% Polish).

Under the Popławski family's management, particularly Tomasz August, the estate experienced significant economic development. Having received thorough training in estate management in Germany, Tomasz August modernized the farm buildings and housing for farm workers. He constructed a network of field railways running from Łysołaje to the farm in Struża near Biskupice, with one branch leading to the railway station. He also built a distillery to process agricultural products. The interwar period saw the establishment of several general stores in Łysołaje.

During the Russian Partition, local intelligentsia led by estate owner Tomasz August Popławski established a secret Polish-language school disguised as a nursery for farm workers' children. An official Polish school was established in 1916, during the Austrian occupation in World War I.

=== World War II ===
In the first days of World War II in 1939, the Łysołaje area remained relatively calm until September 9, when sporadic German air raids targeted the railway line and nearby Jaszczów station. Around September 18, German forces arrived after a skirmish with an evacuation train. They established a corps headquarters in the palace and the unfinished new school building.

During the German occupation of Poland, the Łysołaje estate was placed under German administration as a "Landwirtschaft." Jews from the ghettos in nearby Biskupice and Trawniki were employed as forced laborers. The Germans also established a gendarmerie post in the unfinished school building, which remained there until the end of the occupation.

=== Post-war period ===
After the war, the new authorities parceled out the Łysołaje estate. The remaining portion became a State Agricultural Farm (PGR), which operated until the dissolution of such enterprises in the 1990s. It was subsequently replaced by the Eko-vit company. A distillery established before the war continues to operate. The palace, located in the park, initially housed a vocational school and later became a sanatorium as part of the Psychiatric Hospital in Lublin-Abramowice.

== Administration ==
During the administrative reorganization of Poland (1975–1998), the village was part of the former Lublin Voivodeship.

Łysołaje-Kolonia constitutes a sołectwo (the smallest administrative unit in rural Poland) within the Milejów municipality.

== Demographics ==
According to the 2011 Polish census, the village had a population of 457 inhabitants. As of the 2021 National Census, the population was 347.

Historical population
Year	Population	Notes
1531	~54 homesteads	Property survey
1827	250	
1921	926	540 village + 386 manor farm
2011	457	National Census
2021	347	National Census

== Notable landmarks ==
- Popławski Palace – A 19th-century residence built by Tomasz August Popławski, surrounded by a naturalistic landscape park. Currently serves as a sanatorium.
- Distillery – A historic distillery established before World War II, still in operation.
- Epidemic memorial – An 18th-century brick monument marking the cemetery of epidemic victims.

== See also ==
- Łysołaje
- Gmina Milejów
- Łęczna County
