= Garne =

Garne is a surname. Notable people with the surname include:

- Rasma Garne (1941–2024), Latvian stage and film actress
- William Garne (1861–1895), English cricketer

== See also ==
- Garnes (surname)
- Gorne, another surname
- Whitford Garne
