= Kajetanówka =

Kajetanówka may refer to the following places:

- Kajetanówka, Biłgoraj County in Lublin Voivodeship (east Poland)
- Kajetanówka, Chełm County in Lublin Voivodeship (east Poland)
- Kajetanówka, Kraśnik County in Lublin Voivodeship (east Poland)
- Kajetanówka, Lublin County in Lublin Voivodeship (east Poland)
- Kajetanówka, Łęczna County in Lublin Voivodeship (east Poland)
