= Białka =

Białka may refer to the following places in Poland:

- Białka, Krasnystaw County in Lublin Voivodeship (east Poland)
- Białka, Łęczna County in Lublin Voivodeship (east Poland)
- Białka, Parczew County in Lublin Voivodeship (east Poland)
- Białka, Radzyń County in Lublin Voivodeship (east Poland)
- Białka, Subcarpathian Voivodeship (south-east Poland)
- Białka, Lesser Poland Voivodeship (south Poland)
- Białka, Gostynin County in Masovian Voivodeship (east-central Poland)
- Białka, Radom County in Masovian Voivodeship (east-central Poland)
- Białka, Gmina Łukta in Warmian-Masurian Voivodeship (north Poland)
- Białka, Gmina Morąg in Warmian-Masurian Voivodeship (north Poland)
- Białka, West Pomeranian Voivodeship (north-west Poland)
- Białka Tatrzańska
- Nowa Białka, Stara Białka, both in Kamienna Góra County, Lower Silesian Voivodeship (south-west Poland)

Rivers in Poland

- Białka (Dunajec), tributary of the Dunajec
- Białka (Kurówka), tributary of the Kurówka
- Białka (Tyśmienica), tributary of the Tyśmienica (Wieprz)
