= Garnes =

Garnes may refer to the following locations in Norway:

- Garnes, Ulstein in Ulstein Municipality in Møre og Romsdal county
- Garnes, Hordaland in Bergen Municipality in Vestland county
- Garnes, Trøndelag in Verdal Municipality in Trøndelag county

== Elsewhere ==
- Garnes Township, Red Lake County, Minnesota, United States

== See also ==
- Garnes (surname)
