= Gorne =

Gorne is a surname. Notable people with the surname include:

- Annette Vande Gorne (born 1946), Belgian electroacoustic music composer
- Renan Gorne (born 1996), Brazilian footballer

== See also ==
- Górne, locations
- Garne, another surname
