= Brodzisz =

Brodzisz is a surname. Notable people with the surname include:

- Adam Brodzisz (1906–1986), Polish actor
- Paweł Brodzisz (born 1975), Polish painter
