= Church of the Assumption of the Blessed Virgin and St Anthony of Padua =

Church in Lublin Voivodeship, Poland

Coordinates: 51.2320°N 22.9249°E

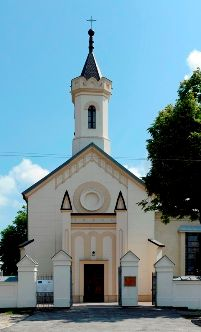
- Facade.

Religion
- Affiliation: Roman Catholic Church
- Province: Diocese of Rome
- Rite: Latin
- Ecclesiastical or organizational status: Parish Church
- Leadership: Andrzej Sulowski
- Year consecrated: 1859

Location
- Location: Milejów, Poland
- Interactive map of Church of the Assumption of the Blessed Virgin and St Anthony of Padua

Architecture
- Architect: Konstanty Hendiger
- Type: Church
- Style: Historicism
- Groundbreaking: 1855
- Completed: 1859

Specifications
- Length: 40
- Width: 13
- Height (max): 30

The Church of the Assumption of the Blessed Virgin and St Anthony of Padua is a parish church in Milejów, Lublin Voivodeship, in the Metropolitan Archdiocese of Lublin, Poland.

== History ==
Efforts to church in Milejów started with the beginning of the nineteenth century, and took it as the first Helena Suffczyńskich Chrapowicka. Since, however, he died before completing the work, took the initiative and Antoni Stanislaw counts Rostworowscy.

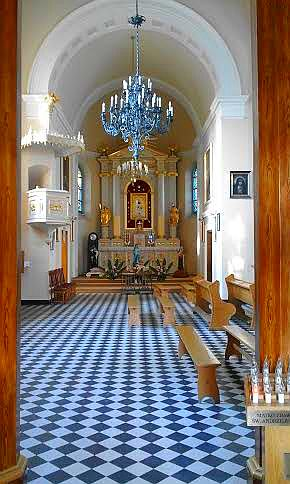
The old part of the church.

Milejów church was built in the years 1855 — 1859, and its architect was Konstanty Hendiger from Krasnystaw. The temple was consecrated by Bishop Walenty Baranowski on 2 October 1859. In the sacristy is the act of consecration of the church.

In the years 1990 — 1996 the efforts of the parish priest, Jan Kalinowski, and expanded the church parishioners. According to the then-new layout of the church was a part of the nave, the old presbytery, a former altar of the Blessed Sacrament chapel. In 2006, a new section contains a stone altar, and since then the sanctuary is located in that part.

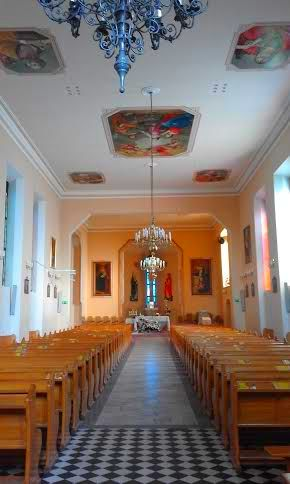
The nave.

=== Important events in the history of the church ===
- 21 April 1855 r. — Commencement of construction;
- 1856 — completion of one of the documents (most likely); usually it is given, however, 1859; the consecration of the temple of October 2, 1859 year by the Bishop Valentine Baranowski;
- approx. 1902 — 1904 — Rostworowscy return from Rome, where they brought the icon of Our Lady of Perpetual Help and the baptismal font and altar stone;
- 1907 — insertion of three stained glass: "St. Anthony","St. Victor" and "Mary, Queen of the Polish Crown";
- 1915 — robbing bells by the Austrians;
- 1928 — building a new tower on the site destroyed during the mating sheet galvanized;
- 1939 or 1940 — again robbing bells;
- 1946 — suspension bell "Mary" – a vote milejowian the experience of World War II;
- 1990 — 1996 — expansion of the church;
- 2006 — transfer of the altar to the new part;
- 2008 — 2016 – the renewal of all movable monuments located in the church thanks to the efforts of the parish priest, Andrzej Juźko.

== Art ==
On the ceiling of the church there are paintings — "Covenant with God", probably by the brothers Ferdynand and Ludwik Ludwig, in the old part and the new middle copy of the painting "Las dos Trinidades", which surround the presentation of the four evangelists. In 2012, between the walls and ceiling, the then parish priest placed inside decorative cornice.

== Organ ==
The first organ in the church built the company from Warsaw of Mateusz Mielczarski, and the efforts of priest Andrzej Juźko restored it and brought new pipes from the Netherlands. The instrument has a single manual and ten votes.

== Bell tower ==
Bell tower was built together with the church, in the same style. It has three arches where the bells are located. Sam bell tower is behind the room (one building), which was formerly Catechetical room.

1915 it hung in the arcades bells "Józef", "Stanisław" and "Antoni", which were looted during World War I by the Austrian occupiers. The new bells were also removed during World War II by the Germans. In 1946 it was founded the bell "Mary" (renovated in 2016) as a vote for the survival of the war by people from Milejów, and in 1999 was given to two new "John Paul II" and "St. Antony".

== The crypt of the church ==
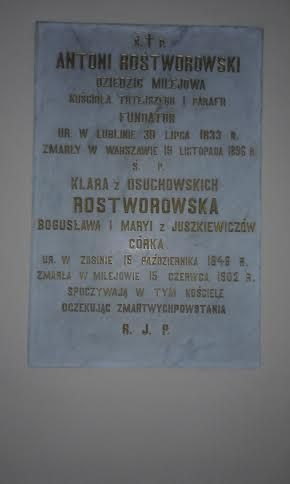

Under the old part of the church there is a crypt with the remains of the founders of the church and the family Rostworowskich.

=== Buried in the crypts ===
- count Anthony Nałęcz Rostworowski (b. March 10, 1789 in Włoszczowa, d. 7 April 1843 in Warsaw), — officer in the Polish army, single orders of Virtuti Militari and the Legion of Honor, senator and member of the Council of State, buried in fathers Capuchins in Warsaw, the heart is in this church; founder of the church;
- Marya Nałęcz Rostworowska (b. 1798 in Warsaw, d. March 20, 1856 in Milejów) — the wife of the founder;
- count Antoni Nałęcz Rostworowski (b. July 30, 1833 in Lublin, 19 November 1896 in Warsaw) — Founder of the church and parish heir Milejów;
- Klara Nałęcz Rostworowska (b. October 15, 1849 in Zosin, d. June 15, 1902 in Milejów) — the wife of the founder;
- count Stanisław Kostka Nałęcz Rostworowski (b. February 26, 1901, d. September 1, 1977) — Sodalis Marianus, heir Milejów last;
- Maria Ludwika Nałęcz Rostworowska (b. December 11, 1900, d. January 12, 1972) — as wife of the last heir Milejów.
