= Zalesie, Łęczna County =

Zalesie
- Village
- Location within Poland
- Coordinates: 51°13′N 22°52′E
- Country: Poland
- Voivodeship: Lublin
- County: Łęczna
- Gmina: Milejów
- Population: 115

Zalesie [zaˈlɛɕɛ] is a village in the administrative district of Gmina Milejów, within Łęczna County, Lublin Voivodeship, in eastern Poland.
