= Białka-Kolonia =

- Village
- Location within Poland
- Coordinates: 51°13′13″N 23°0′49″E
- Country: Poland
- Voivodeship: Lublin
- County: Łęczna
- Gmina: Milejów
- Population: 149

Białka-Kolonia [ˈbjau̯ka kɔˈlɔɲa] is a village in the administrative district of Gmina Milejów, within Łęczna County, Lublin Voivodeship, in eastern Poland.
