= Milejów-Osada =

- Village
- Location within Poland
- Coordinates: 51°13′26″N 22°55′44″E
- Country: Poland
- Voivodeship: Lublin
- County: Łęczna
- Gmina: Milejów
- Population: 2,613

Milejów-Osada [miˈlɛjuf ɔˈsada] is a village in Łęczna County, Lublin Voivodeship, in eastern Poland. It is the seat of the gmina (administrative district) called Gmina Milejów.
