= Grzegorz Bronowicki =

Polish footballer (born 1980)

Personal information
- Full name: Grzegorz Bronowicki
- Date of birth: 4 August 1980 (age 46)
- Place of birth: Jaszczów, Poland
- Height: 1.78 m (5 ft 10 in)
- Position: Defender

Team information
- Current team: Błękit Cyców
- Number: 3

Senior career*
| Years | Team | Apps | (Gls) |
| 1997–2005 | Górnik Łęczna | 132 | (11) |
| 2000–2001 | → Lewart Lubartów (loan) | | |
| 2006–2007 | Legia Warsaw | 32 | (0) |
| 2007–2008 | Red Star Belgrade | 13 | (0) |
| 2009–2010 | Górnik Łęczna | 13 | (0) |
| 2010–2011 | Ruch Chorzów | 8 | (0) |
| 2013 | Motor Lublin | 19 | (2) |
| 2015 | KS Lublin | | |
| 2016 | JKS 1909 Jarosław | 1 | (0) |
| 2018–2019 | Tur Milejów | | |
| 2021– | Błękit Cyców | 70 | (13) |

International career
| 2006–2008 | Poland | 14 | (0) |
- * Club domestic league appearances and goals as of 21:34, 30 June 2026 (UTC)

Grzegorz Bronowicki (Polish pronunciation: [ˈɡʐɛɡɔʐ brɔnɔˈvitski]; born 4 August 1980) is a Polish footballer who plays as a defender for Błękit Cyców. He is currently an assistant coach of Górnik Łęczna's reserve team.

== Career ==
Bronowicki spent most of his early career at Górnik Łęczna, apart from one season on loan at Lewart Lubartów. He attracted interest from many French clubs during the 200607 season, impressing for both Legia Warsaw and the Poland national team, including Poland's 2–1 UEFA EURO 2008 qualifier win over Portugal where he was named man of the match. He was named in the provisional squad for Euro 2008 with the hope that he would recover from a knee injury in time for the tournament. However, he was ultimately removed from the squad after coach Leo Beenhakker determined that his return to fitness would take longer than expected. He signed with Red Star Belgrade in the Serbian SuperLiga however due to his persistent injury problems he had inconsistent exhibitions. Playing as left-back, in his first season in Serbia he managed to play 13 league matches, but in 2008-09 he ended up not playing any league match.

At the end of his contract in summer 2009, he returned to Górnik Łęczna where he progressively recovered, and subsequently, in summer 2010, he signed with Ruch Chorzów returning to Ekstraklasa, the top Polish division. He was released from Ruch in May 2011.

== Personal life ==
His brother, Piotr Bronowicki was also a footballer.

== Honours ==
Legia Warsaw

- Ekstraklasa: 2005–06
