= Cyganka, Lublin Voivodeship =

Cyganka
- Village
- Location within Poland
- Coordinates: 51°11′09″N 22°53′29″E
- Country: Poland
- Voivodeship: Lublin
- County: Łęczna
- Gmina: Milejów
- Population: 179

Cyganka [t͡sɨˈɡanka] is a village in the administrative district of Gmina Milejów, within Łęczna County, Lublin Voivodeship, in eastern Poland.
