= Maryniów =

- Village
- Location within Poland
- Coordinates: 51°14′N 23°0′E
- Country: Poland
- Voivodeship: Lublin
- County: Łęczna
- Gmina: Milejów

Population
  - Total: 255
- Time zone: UTC+1 (CET)
  - Summer (DST): UTC+2 (CEST)

Maryniów [maˈrɨɲuf] is a village in the administrative district of Gmina Milejów, within Łęczna County, Lublin Voivodeship, in eastern Poland.

== History ==
Six Polish citizens were murdered by Nazi Germany in the village during World War II.
