= Zgniła Struga =

- Village
- Location within Poland
- Coordinates: 51°13′N 23°3′E
- Country: Poland
- Voivodeship: Lublin
- County: Łęczna
- Gmina: Milejów
- Population: 90

Zgniła Struga [ˈzɡniwa ˈstruɡa] is a village in the administrative district of Gmina Milejów, within Łęczna County, Lublin Voivodeship, in eastern Poland.
