= Gmina Milejów =

Gmina Milejów Milejów Commune
- Gmina
- Coat of arms
- Interactive map of Gmina Milejów
- Coordinates (Milejów-Osada): 51°13′26″N 22°55′44″E
- Country: Poland
- Voivodeship: Lublin
- County: Łęczna
- Seat: Milejów-Osada

Area
  - Total: 115.66 km^{2} (44.66 sq mi)

Population (2015)
  - Total: 9,263
  - Density: 80.09/km^{2} (207.4/sq mi)
- Website: https://www.milejow.pl

Gmina Milejów is a rural gmina (administrative district) in Łęczna County, Lublin Voivodeship, in eastern Poland. Its seat is the village of Milejów-Osada, which lies approximately 10 kilometres (6 mi) south of Łęczna and 26 km (16 mi) east of the regional capital Lublin.

The gmina covers an area of 115.66 square kilometres (44.7 sq mi), and as of 2006 its total population is 9,256 (9,263 in 2015). Gmina Milejów is the only municipality in Łęczna County located on the Lublin–Chełm railway line. The area has historically been associated with fruit and vegetable processing industry.

== History ==
Throughout the centuries, the estates of Milejów belonged to many prominent noble and magnate families. The gmina has a rich history dating back to the medieval period, with several villages in the area mentioned in historical records from the 14th century.

== Notable landmarks ==
=== Milejów Manor ===
The manor house in Milejów is a two-story wooden building constructed in 1903 by Antoni Rostworowski. A distillery is located nearby, down by the Wieprz River.

=== Church of the Assumption of the Blessed Virgin Mary ===
The Roman Catholic parish church in Milejów was built in an eclectic style between 1855 and 1859. It was funded by Helena Chrapowiecka (née Suffczyńska) and Stanisław and Antoni Rostworowski. The church was expanded between 1990 and 1996. A bell tower with three bells stands next to the church, and part of the original fence includes a wall with an iron gate from the period of the church's construction.

=== Chapel of St. John of Nepomuk ===
A chapel dedicated to St. John of Nepomuk was built at the beginning of the 20th century and forms part of the manor complex.

=== Milejów Sugar Factory ===
The Milejów Sugar Factory was established in 1907 as a joint-stock company, with local landowners on its board of directors. Two workers' housing buildings were constructed alongside the factory. After World War II, the site became a fruit and vegetable processing plant.

=== Independence Cross ===
The Independence Cross in Milejów was constructed by residents of Milejów and Jaszczów in 1918–1919 to commemorate Poland's regaining of independence.

== War memorials and cemeteries ==
=== Milejów Cemetery ===
The cemetery in Milejów contains the grave of an unknown soldier from 1939, as well as the grave of January Uprising participant Romuald Kostkowski.

=== Partisan Memorial in Majdan Siostrzytowski ===
A memorial marks the site of a battle on May 24, 1945, after World War II had ended in Europe. A unit of "cursed soldiers" led by Major Józef Wojtuń (nom de guerre "Sęk-Zawieja") fought against soldiers of the communist Security Office and the Soviet NKVD. The battle occurred due to the betrayal of one of the partisans. The attackers managed to surround and attack the sleeping partisans, resulting in the deaths of 27 fighters. Seventeen of the fallen are buried in a mass grave at the battle site, while the remaining bodies were taken by families and buried in local cemeteries.

=== War Cemetery in Maryniów ===
A World War I military cemetery containing the graves of German, Austrian, and Russian soldiers.

=== War Cemetery in Zalesie ===
A World War I military cemetery with graves of Polish, German, and Russian soldiers.

=== January Uprising Mound in Klarów ===
A burial mound in Klarów marks the grave of January Uprising insurgents from 1863. It is located at the entrance to a forest and is surrounded by trees with a cross.

=== Ostrówek-Kolonia Memorial ===
A monument unveiled in 1986 commemorates 24 village residents murdered by the Germans in 1944. The village was pacified by the occupiers for cooperating with partisans.

== Villages ==
Gmina Milejów contains the villages and settlements of Antoniów, Antoniów-Kolonia, Białka, Białka-Kolonia, Cyganka, Dąbrowa, Górne, Jaszczów, Jaszczów-Kolonia, Kajetanówka, Klarów, Łańcuchów, Łysołaje, Łysołaje-Kolonia, Maryniów, Milejów, Milejów-Osada, Ostrówek-Kolonia, Popławy, Starościce, Wólka Bielecka, Wólka Łańcuchowska, Zalesie and Zgniła Struga.

== Neighbouring gminas ==
Gmina Milejów is bordered by the gminas of Łęczna, Mełgiew, Piaski, Puchaczów, Siedliszcze and Trawniki.

== Transport ==
The gmina is served by a station on the PKP Lublin–Chełm railway line.

== See also ==
- Łęczna County
- Lublin Voivodeship
