= Wólka Bielecka =

- Village
- Location within Poland
- Coordinates: 51°13′50″N 23°01′40″E
- Country: Poland
- Voivodeship: Lublin
- County: Łęczna
- Gmina: Milejów
- Population: 172

Wólka Bielecka [ˈvulka bjɛˈlɛt͡ska] is a village in the administrative district of Gmina Milejów, within Łęczna County, Lublin Voivodeship, in eastern Poland.
