= Popławy, Łęczna County =

Popławy
- Village
- Location within Poland
- Coordinates: 51°12′N 22°54′E
- Country: Poland
- Voivodeship: Lublin
- County: Łęczna
- Gmina: Milejów
- Population: 222

Popławy [pɔˈpwavɨ] is a village in the administrative district of Gmina Milejów, within Łęczna County, Lublin Voivodeship, in eastern Poland.
