= Wólka Łańcuchowska =

- Village
- Location within Poland
- Coordinates: 51°16′N 22°54′E
- Country: Poland
- Voivodeship: Lublin
- County: Łęczna
- Gmina: Milejów

Population
  - Total: 248
- Time zone: UTC+1 (CET)
  - Summer (DST): UTC+2 (CEST)
- Vehicle registration: LLE

Wólka Łańcuchowska [ˈvulka waɲt͡suˈxɔfska] is a village in the administrative district of Gmina Milejów, within Łęczna County, Lublin Voivodeship, in eastern Poland.

== History ==
According to the 1921 Polish census, the population of was 99.5% Polish and 0.5% Ukrainian.

Following the German-Soviet invasion of Poland, which started World War II in September 1939, the village was occupied by Germany until 1944. In March 1944, the German troops and Ukrainian auxiliaries committed a massacre of three Poles and one Jew.
