= Antoniów, Lublin Voivodeship =

Antoniów
- Village
- Location within Poland
- Coordinates: 51°14′N 22°52′E
- Country: Poland
- Voivodeship: Lublin
- County: Łęczna
- Gmina: Milejów
- Population: 240

Antoniów [anˈtɔɲuf] is a village in the administrative district of Gmina Milejów, within Łęczna County, Lublin Voivodeship, in eastern Poland.
