= Milejów, Lublin Voivodeship =

Milejów
- Village
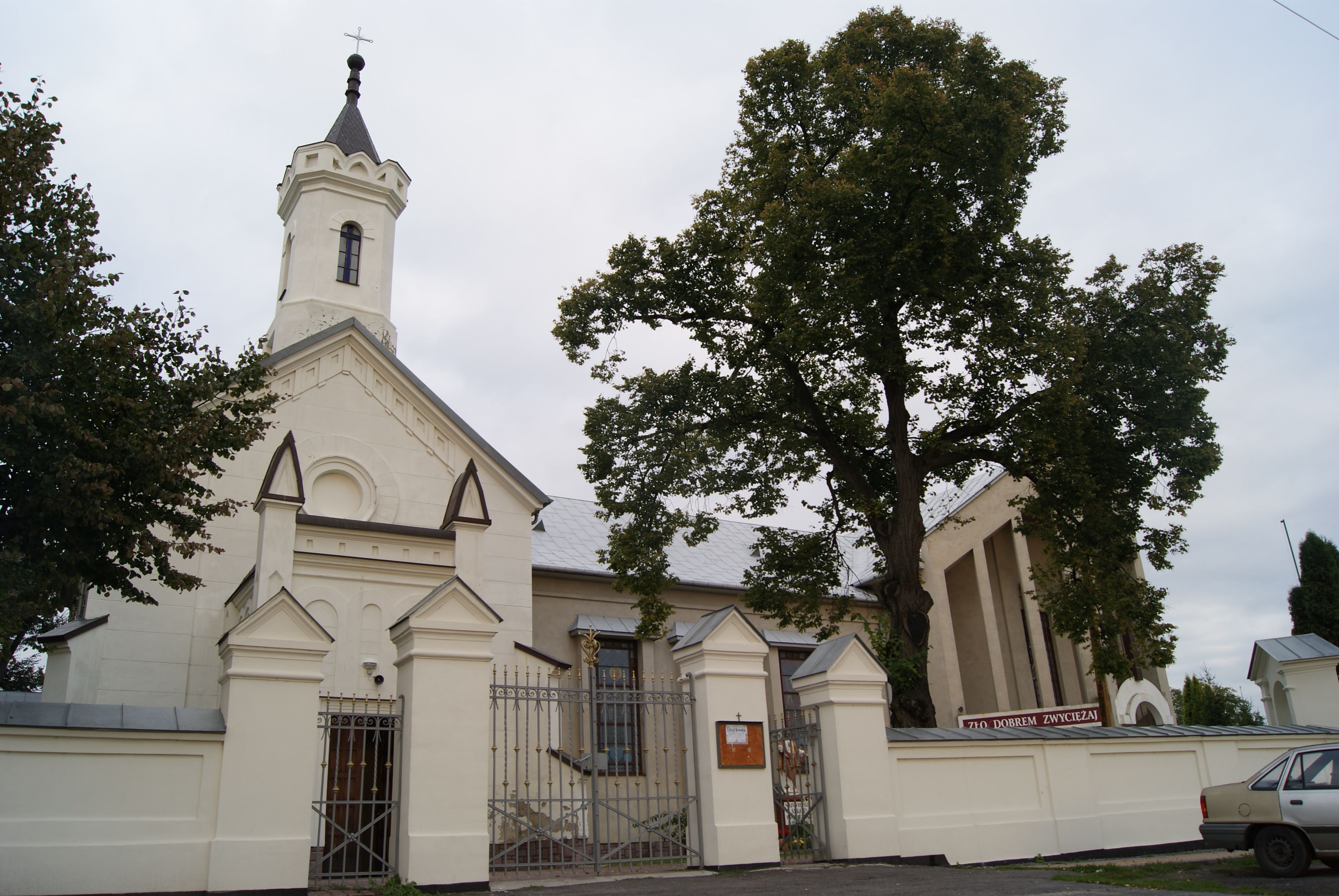
- Church of the Assumption of the Blessed Virgin and St Anthony of Padua

- Location within Poland
- Coordinates: 51°13′39″N 22°55′38″E
- Country: Poland
- Voivodeship: Lublin
- County: Łęczna
- Gmina: Milejów

Population
  - Total: 2,676
- Time zone: UTC+1 (CET)
  - Summer (DST): UTC+2 (CEST)
- Vehicle registration: LLE

Milejów [miˈlɛjuf] is a village in the administrative district of Gmina Milejów, within Łęczna County, Lublin Voivodeship, in eastern Poland.

== Religion ==
The parish church is the Church of Assumption of Blessed Virgin and St Anthony of Padua.
