= Ostrówek-Kolonia, Łęczna County =

Ostrówek-Kolonia
- Village
- Location within Poland
- Coordinates: 51°15′11″N 22°59′00″E
- Country: Poland
- Voivodeship: Lublin
- County: Łęczna
- Gmina: Milejów
- Population: 309

Ostrówek-Kolonia [ɔsˈtruvɛk kɔˈlɔɲa] is a village in the administrative district of Gmina Milejów, within Łęczna County, Lublin Voivodeship, in eastern Poland.
