= Piotr Bronowicki =

Polish footballer

Personal information
- Full name: Piotr Bronowicki
- Date of birth: 10 September 1981 (age 45)
- Place of birth: Świdnik, Poland
- Height: 1.80 m (5 ft 11 in)
- Position: Right-back

Senior career*
Years	Team	Apps	(Gls)
1997–2006	Górnik Łęczna		
2007–2008	Legia Warsaw	18	(0)
2009	Piast Gliwice	3	(0)
2009–2010	Górnik Łęczna	12	(0)
2009	Górnik Łęczna II	1	(0)
2010	Pogoń 07 Lubartów		
- * Club domestic league appearances and goals

Piotr Bronowicki (born 10 September 1981) is a Polish former professional footballer who played as a right-back.

Having started playing football with Górnik Łęczna, Bronowicki moved to Legia Warsaw in 2007. His brother, Grzegorz, is also a footballer.

== Honours ==
Legia Warsaw

- Polish Cup: 2007–08
