= Górne =

Górne may refer to the following places:

- Górne, Lublin Voivodeship (east Poland)
- Górne, Warmian-Masurian Voivodeship (north Poland)
- Górne, West Pomeranian Voivodeship (north-west Poland)
