= William Garne =

English cricketer

- Born: 9 May 1861; Middle Aston, England
- Died: 24 May 1895 (aged 34); Wellingborough, England
- Occupation: Cricketer

William Garne (9 May 1861 – 24 May 1895) was an English cricketer. He was a right-handed batsman and right-arm medium-pace bowler who played for Gloucestershire. He was born in Middle Aston, Oxfordshire and died in Wellingborough, Northamptonshire.

Garne made a single first-class appearance for the team, during the 1884 season, against Sussex. From the lower-middle order, he scored a duck in the first innings in which he batted, and 2 runs in the second.

Garne died at the age of 34.
