= Jaszczów-Kolonia =

- Village
- Location within Poland
- Coordinates: 51°12′39″N 22°57′14″E
- Country: Poland
- Voivodeship: Lublin
- County: Łęczna
- Gmina: Milejów
- Population: 251

Jaszczów-Kolonia [ˈjaʂt͡ʂuf kɔˈlɔɲa] is a village in the administrative district of Gmina Milejów, within Łęczna County, Lublin Voivodeship, in eastern Poland.
