= Paweł Brodzisz =

Polish painter & illustrator (born 1975)

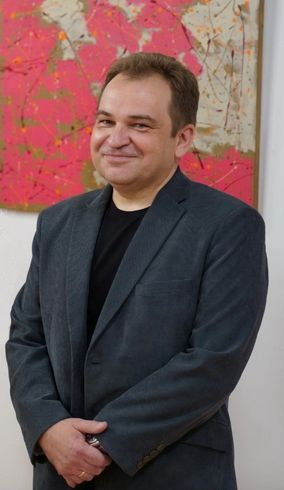
- Formal portrait, 20 October 2022
- Born: Paweł Brodzisz; 15 February 1975 (age 51); Jaszczów, Poland
- Education: University of Life Sciences in Lublin (2000), Maria Curie-Skłodowska University (2005), John Paul II Catholic University of Lublin (2011).
- Known for: Painter, illustrator
- Spouse: Małgorzata Brodzisz
- Children: 2; including: Adam Brodzisz; Joanna Brodzisz
- Parents: Bogumił Brodzisz (father); Joanna Brodzisz (mother)
- Awards: Decoration for Merit to Polish Culture (2025) Honorary Badge for Merits to the Lublin Voivodeship (2025)

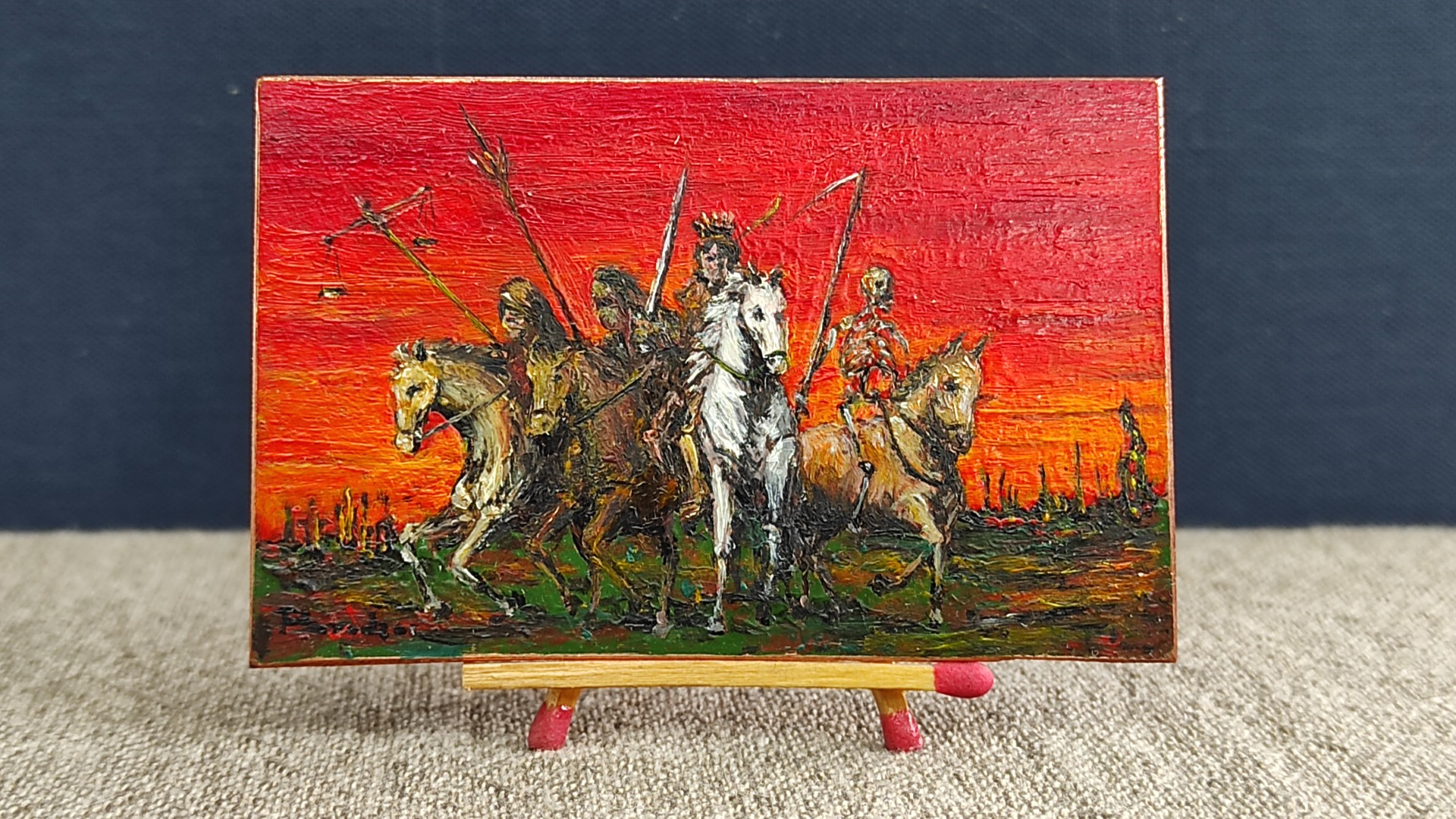
Four Horsemen of the Apocalypse, a 2025 miniature painting by Paweł Brodzisz, depicts the riders moving as a group from left to right: Famine, War, Pestilence, and Death. It is an oil and alkyd on copper painting, measuring 50 × 77 mm. It is currently on exhibit at the Muzeum Miniaturowej Sztuki Profesjonalnej Henryk Jan Dominiak in Tychy.

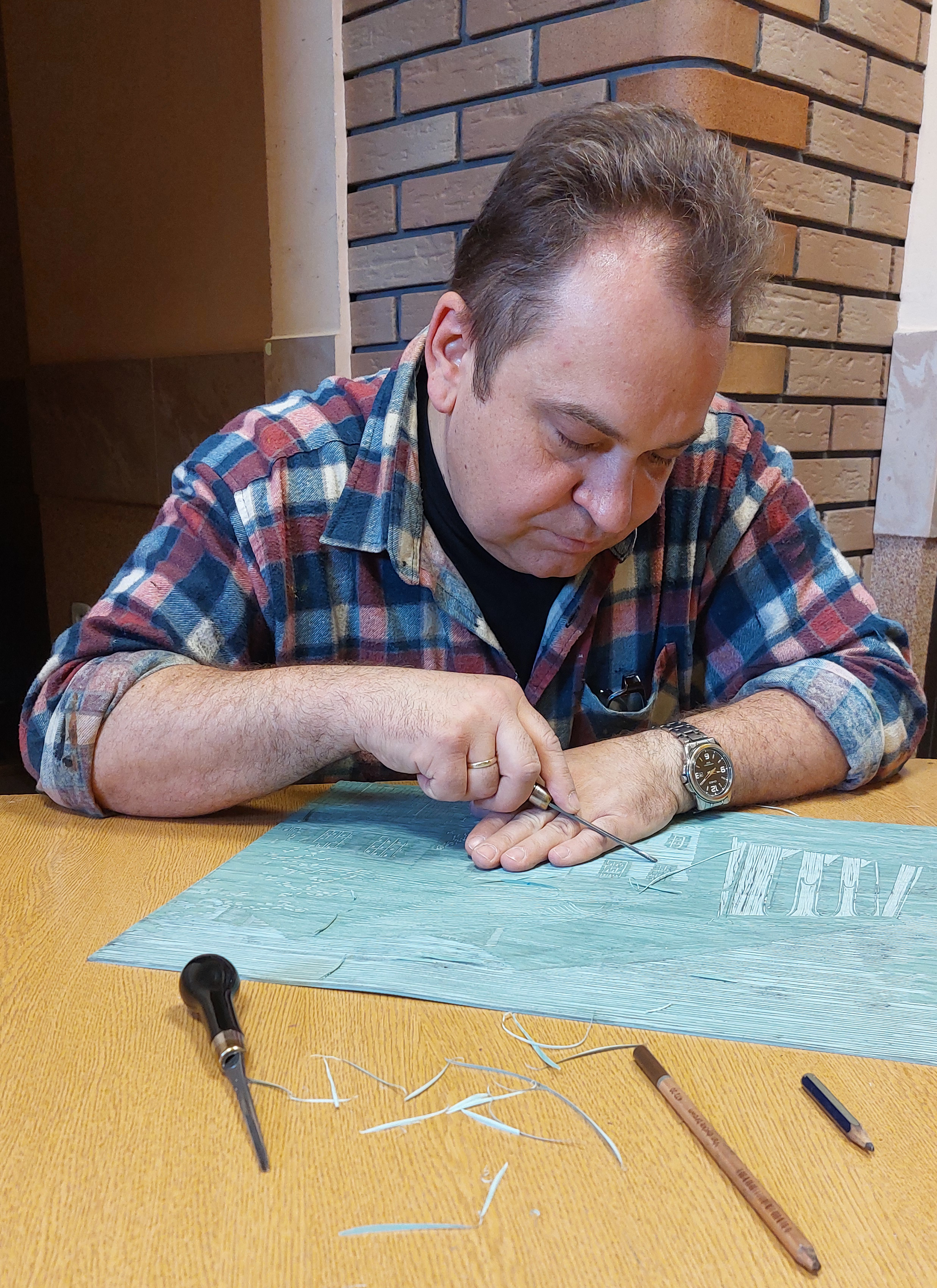
Brodzisz using a handheld gouger to cut a design into the linoleum surface for a linocut print, on May 17, 2025.

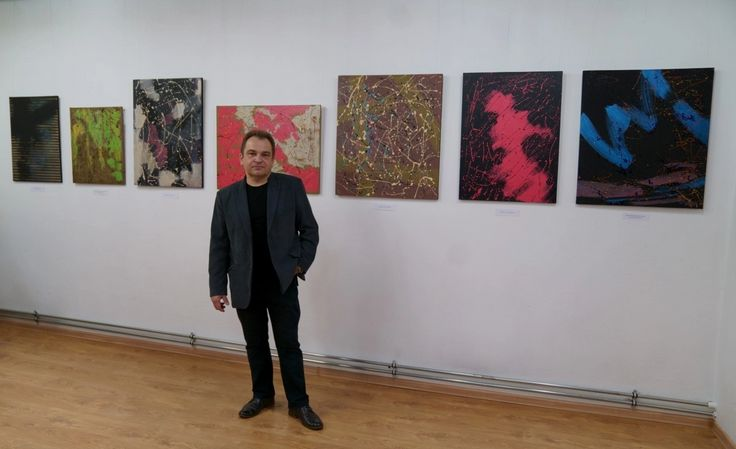
Matushka roSSiya, Brodzisz posing in front of his paintings in 2022.

Paweł Brodzisz (pronounced [ˈpavɛw ˈbrɔd͡ʑiʂ]; born 15 February 1975) is a Polish painter, photographer, graphic artist, miniaturist, and illustrator whose works have been exhibited both in Poland and internationally. He is also a regionalist, focusing on the Lublin and Silesia regions.

== Education ==
Paweł Brodzisz completed an engineering degree in agriculture at The University of Life Sciences in Lublin. He holds a master’s degree in visual arts education with a specialization in painting from the Faculty of Arts at Maria Curie-Skłodowska University (MCSU). He also completed postgraduate studies in human resource management at the Faculty of Social Sciences of the John Paul II Catholic University of Lublin.

== Work and artistic work ==
His artistic journey began with participation in a group exhibition in 1992 in Łęczna. He most often creates paintings in vivid, intense colours, using the oil-alkyd technique on canvas, but he also works on ceramics and decorative stones. At the same time, he is passionate about printmaking, with linocut being his favourite technique. He also creates monotypes and photographs. In addition, he is involved in documenting and researching the history of Łęczna, the town where he lives and works.

== Exhibitions and Open-Air Art Events ==
Paweł Brodzisz has participated in over one hundred group exhibitions (both international and in Poland) and has held nearly forty solo exhibitions of his own works.

He has taken part in international open-air art events in Hungary, Ukraine, Belarus, Japan, South Korea, the Czech Republic, Romania, Germany, and Austria, while also cooperating with artists from these countries.

== International exhibitions ==
=== Austria ===
- Vienna – 2013

=== South Korea (Gunsan) ===
- 2013 – The 27th ASROPA International Exhibition – SANTAROSA Gallery
- 2018 – The 34th ASROPA International Art Exhibition – Gunsan Arts Center (89 artists from 39 countries)
- 2019 – The 35th ASROPA Exhibition – Gunsan Modern History Museum
- 2019 – The 35th ASROPA International Art Collective Exhibition – Gunsan Saemangeum Convention Center
- 2019 – The 37th ASROPA International Art Exhibition, 1st Exhibition – Gunsan Convention Center (Oct. 24–26, 2019)
- 2019 – The 37th ASROPA International Art Exhibition, 2nd Exhibition – Gunsan Modern History Museum (Oct. 30–Nov. 30, 2019)
- 2019 – The 37th ASROPA International Art Exhibition, 3rd Exhibition – Gunsan Art Center (Dec. 5–11, 2019)

=== Hungary ===
- Hajdúhadház – 2001

=== Italy ===
- Treviolo – 2004

== Collections ==
=== His works in Museums ===
Portraits of famous people

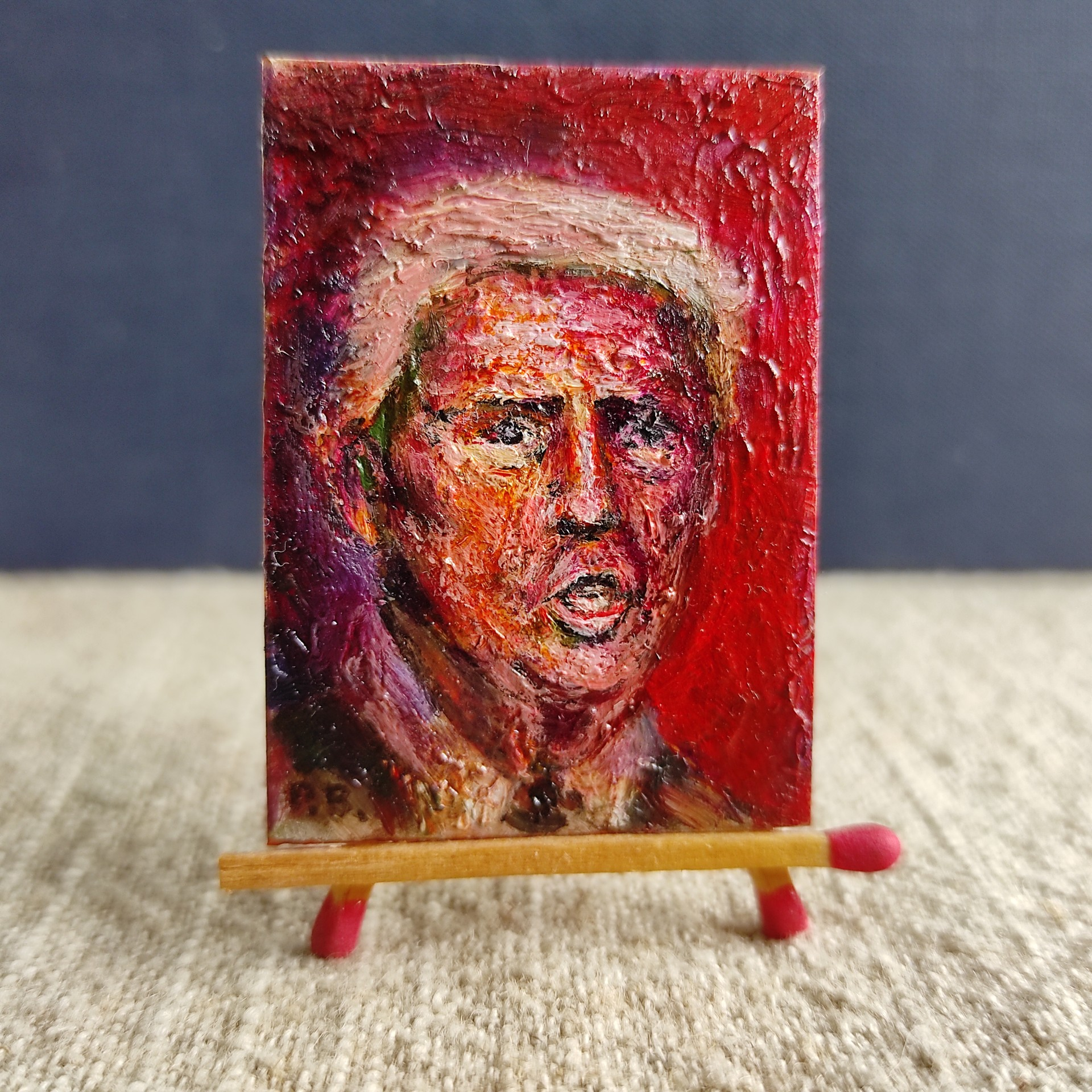
Donald Trump, 49 × 35 mm.

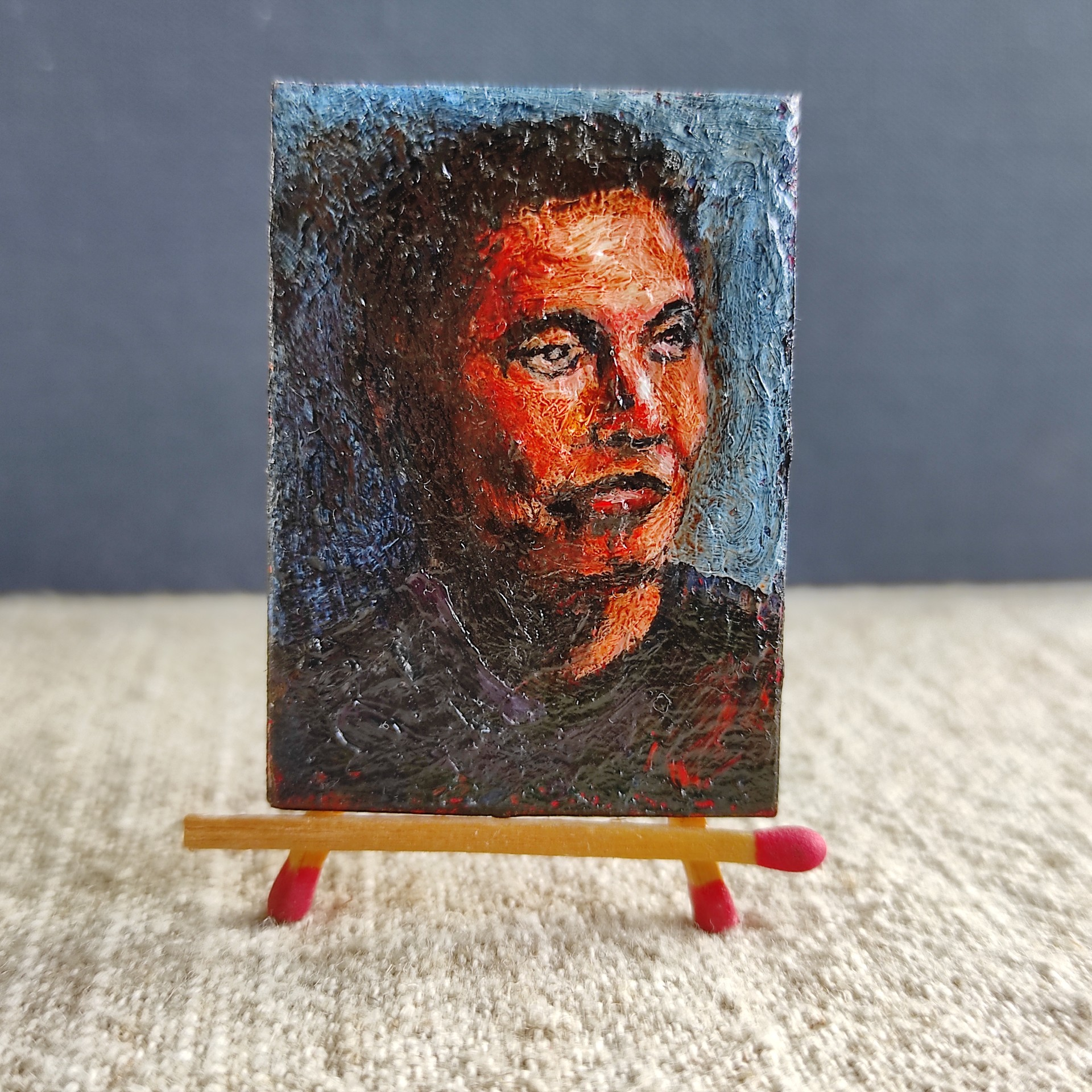
Elon Musk, 50 × 35 mm.

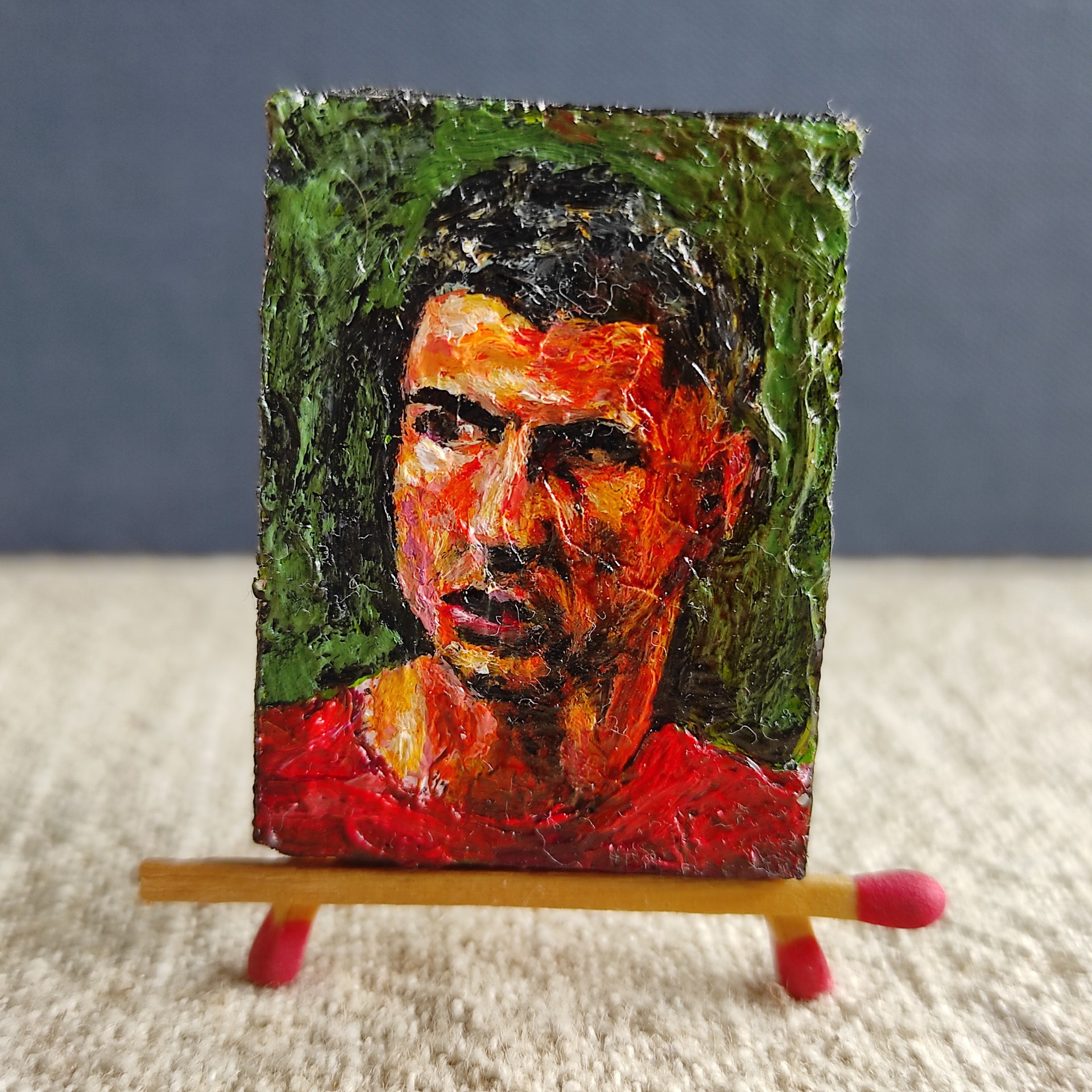
Cristiano Ronaldo, 40 × 30 mm.

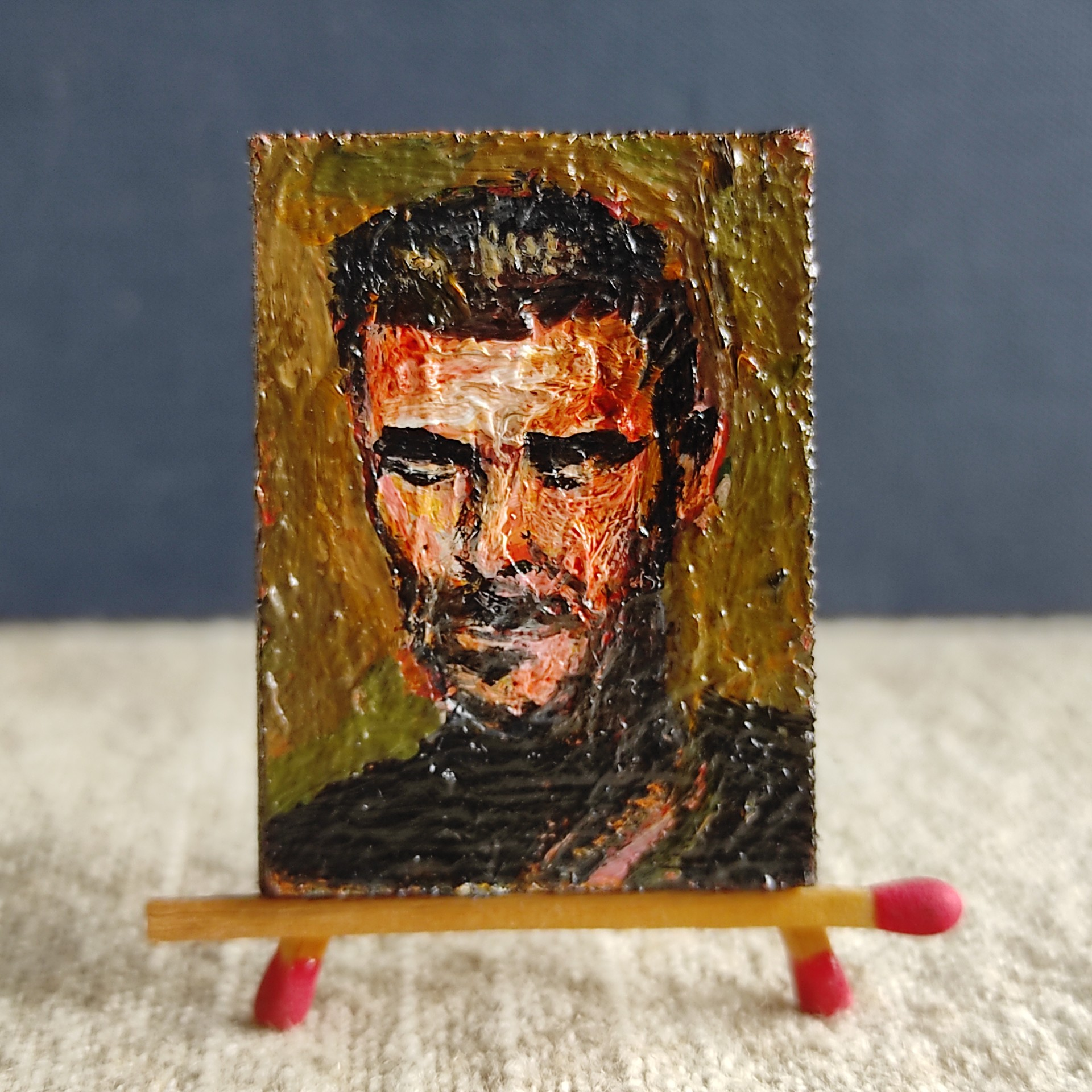
David Beckham, 40 × 30 mm.

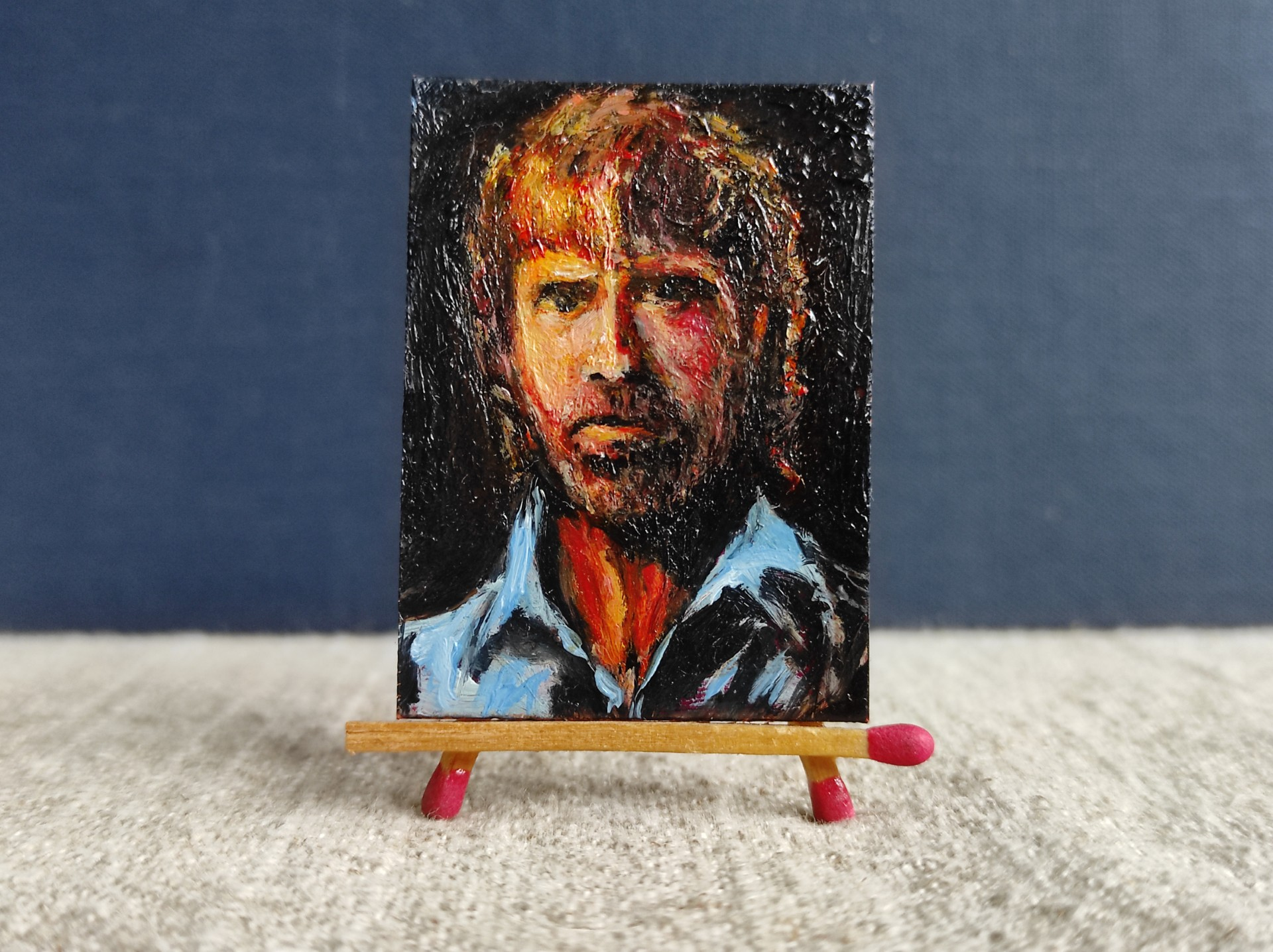
Chuck Norris, 49 × 35 mm.

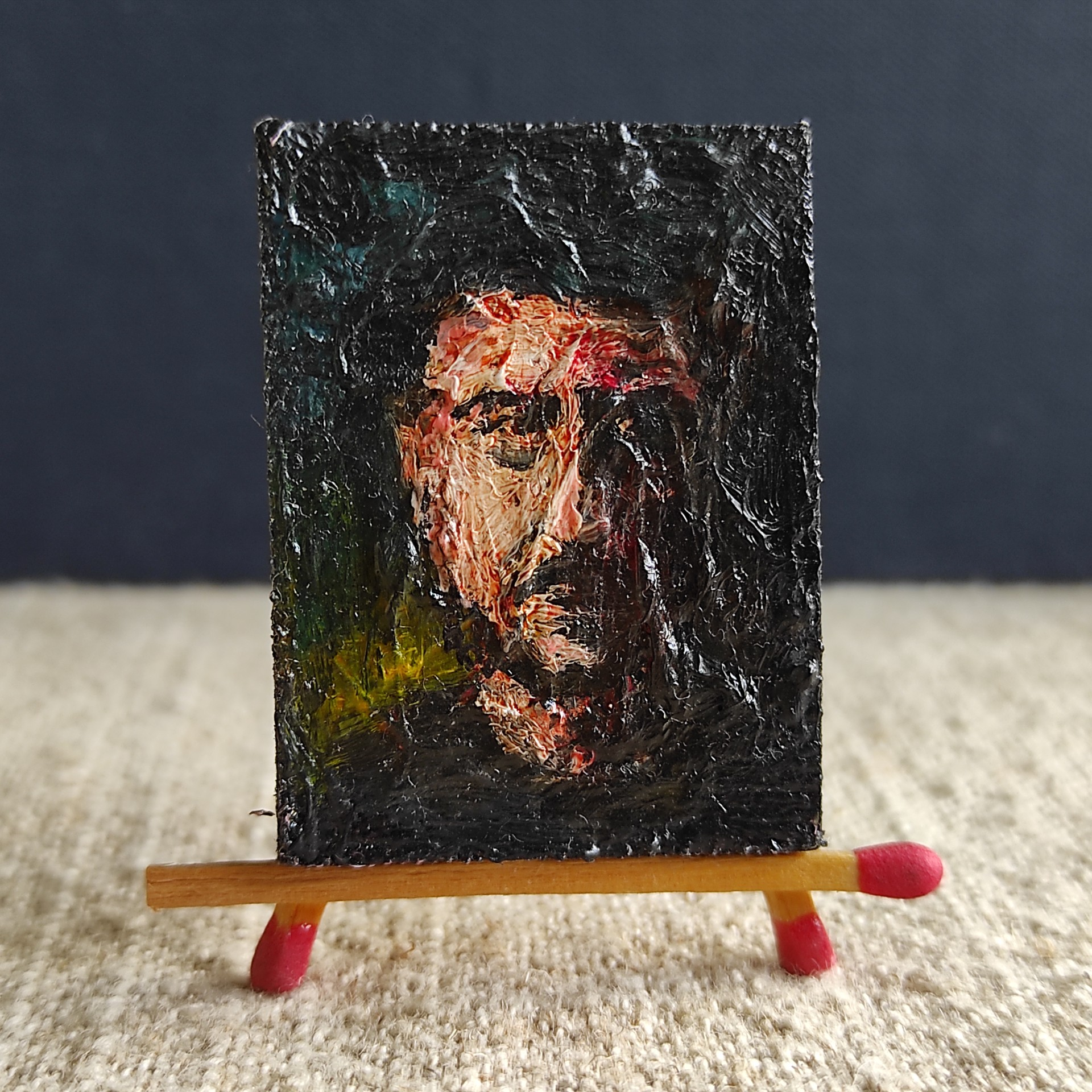
Volodymyr Zelenskyy, 40 × 30 mm.

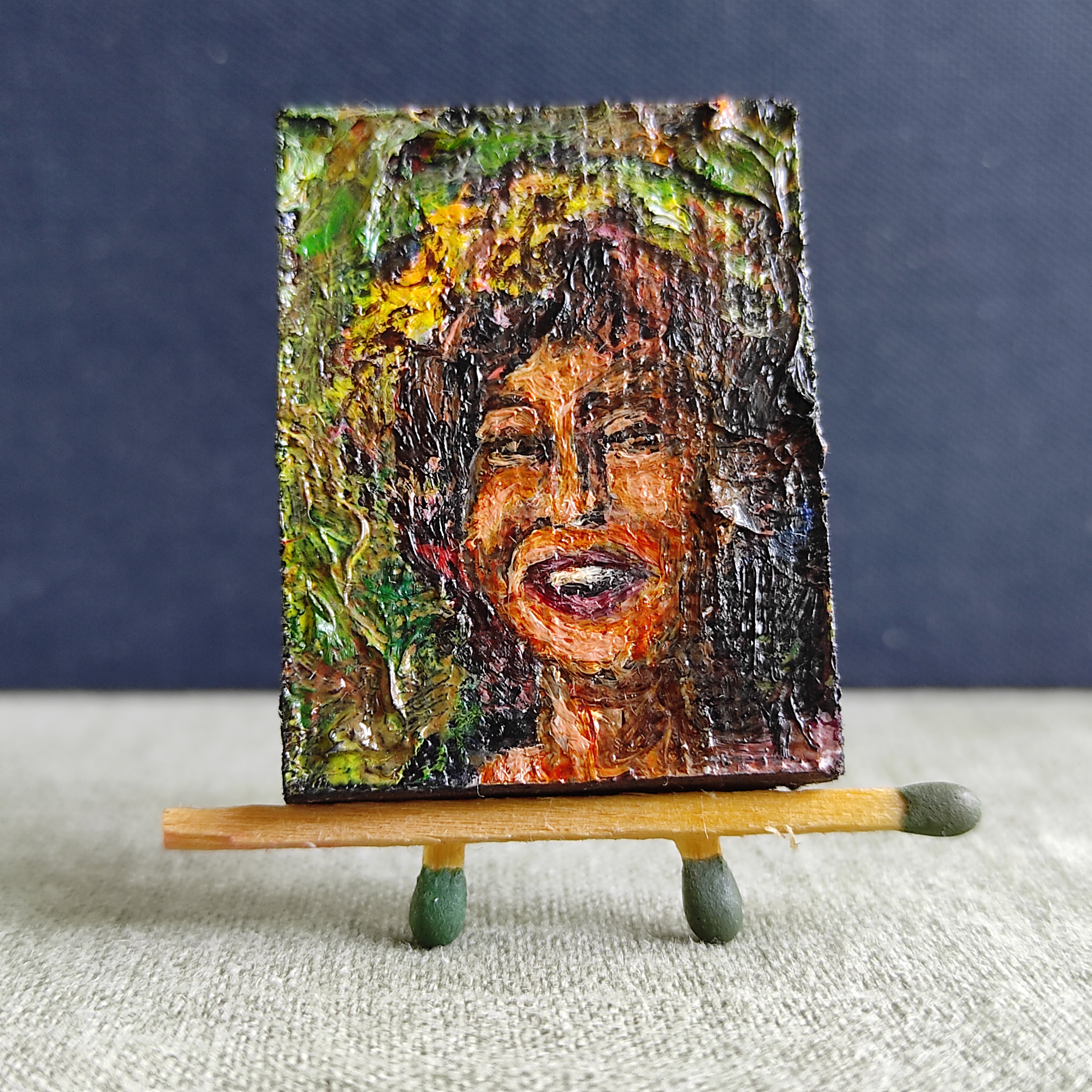
Tina Turner, 39 × 30 mm.

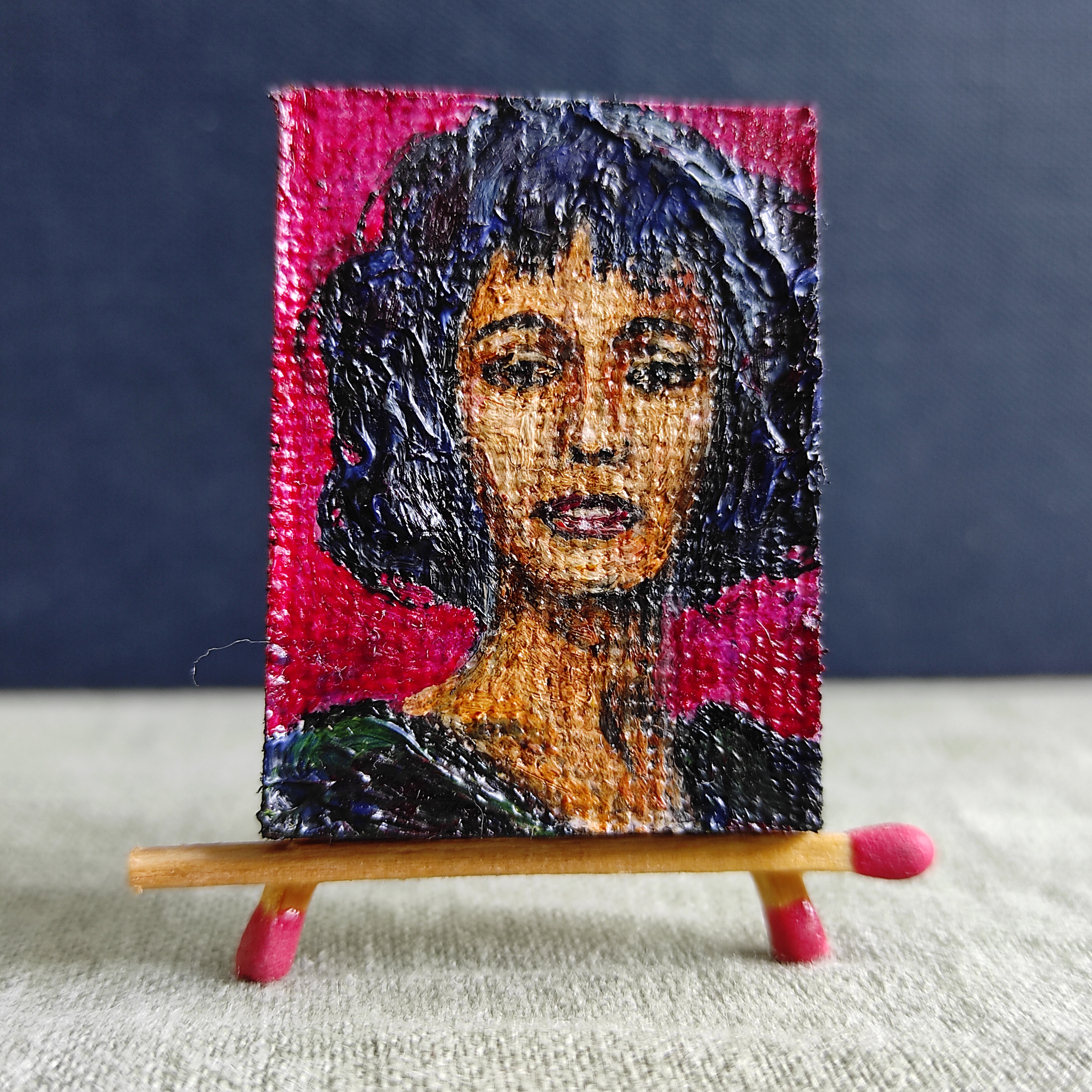
Whitney Houston, 41 × 30 mm.

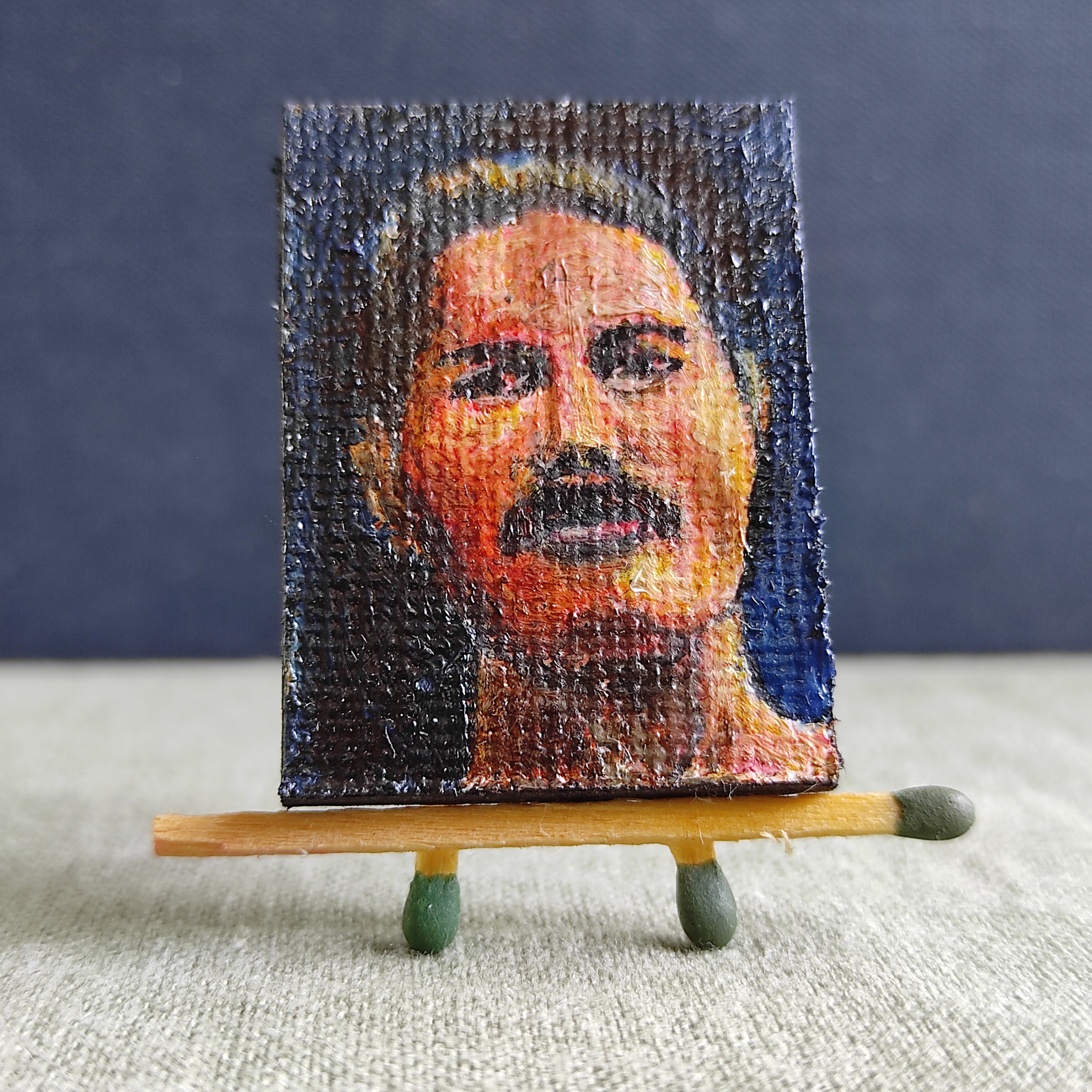
Freddie Mercury, 40 × 29 mm.

Miniatures are part of the collection at the Muzeum Miniaturowej Sztuki Profesjonalnej Henryk Jan Dominiak in Tychy. Since 2013, Brodzisz has been closely aligned with the museum, cooperating across numerous areas, including the visual arts (are art forms such as painting, and printmaking/linocut), culture, and history.

== Personal life ==
Paweł Brodzisz is married to Małgorzata, with whom he has two children.

== Honours and awards ==
=== Honours ===
- Decoration of Honor Meritorious for Polish Culture (2025)
- Honorary Badge for Merits to the Lublin Voivodeship (2025)

=== Awards ===
- Nagroda Kulturalna Województwa Lubelskiego (Cultural Award of the Lublin Voivodeship) for lifetime achievement in cultural activities – 2013
- Jesień Plastyczna – Hrubieszów 2005 – awarded by the Director of the Muzeum im. ks. Stanisława Staszica in Hrubieszów for the work Ubrana w czerń i błękit (Dressed in Black and Blue) (2005)
- Łęczyński Odyniec Kultury (Łęczna Boar of Culture) – awarded by Mayor Teodor Kosiarski for significant contributions to local cultural development – 2015
- 2nd Reconnaissance Squadron (1918–1921) – co-edited publication prepared by the Centre of Culture in Łęczna, awarded the Wawrzyn Pawła Konrada (Paweł Konrad Laurel) and the title Książka Roku 2010 (Book of the Year 2010) in the Album – Lublin Region category by the Wojewódzka Biblioteka Publiczna im. Hieronima Łopacińskiego w Lublinie (the Hieronim Łopaciński Provincial Public Library in Lublin) – 2010

== Gallery ==
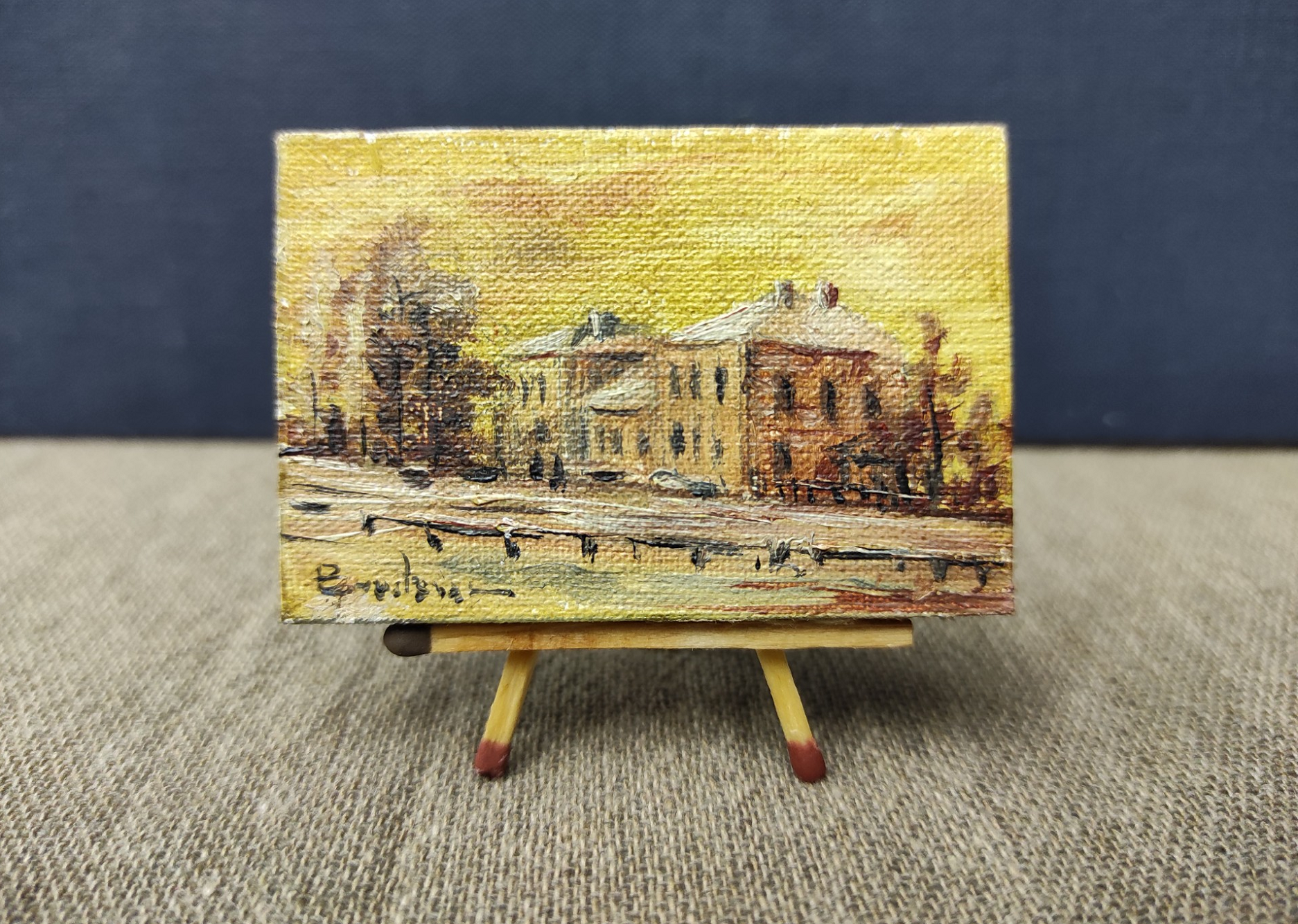
Vienna Station, early 20th Century (Polish: Dworzec Wiedeński początek XX wieku); – (2013). Oil miniature on canvas, 40 × 61 mm. Exhibit at the Muzeum Miniaturowej Sztuki Profesjonalnej Henryk Jan Dominiak in Tychy – part of the series Silesian Architecture in Miniature.

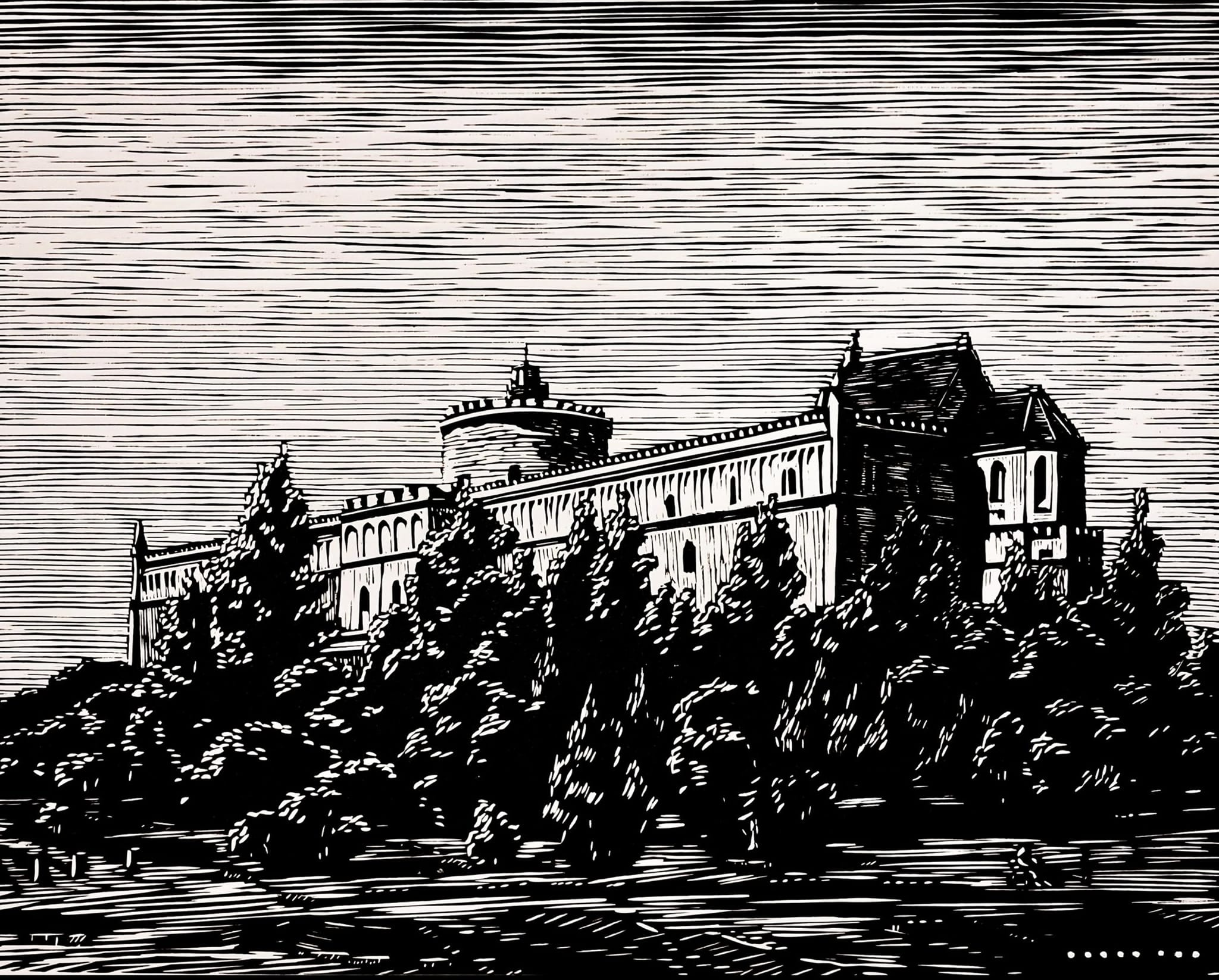
Lublin Castle (Polish: Zamek Lubelski); – (2022). Linocut on paper, 37 × 47 cm.

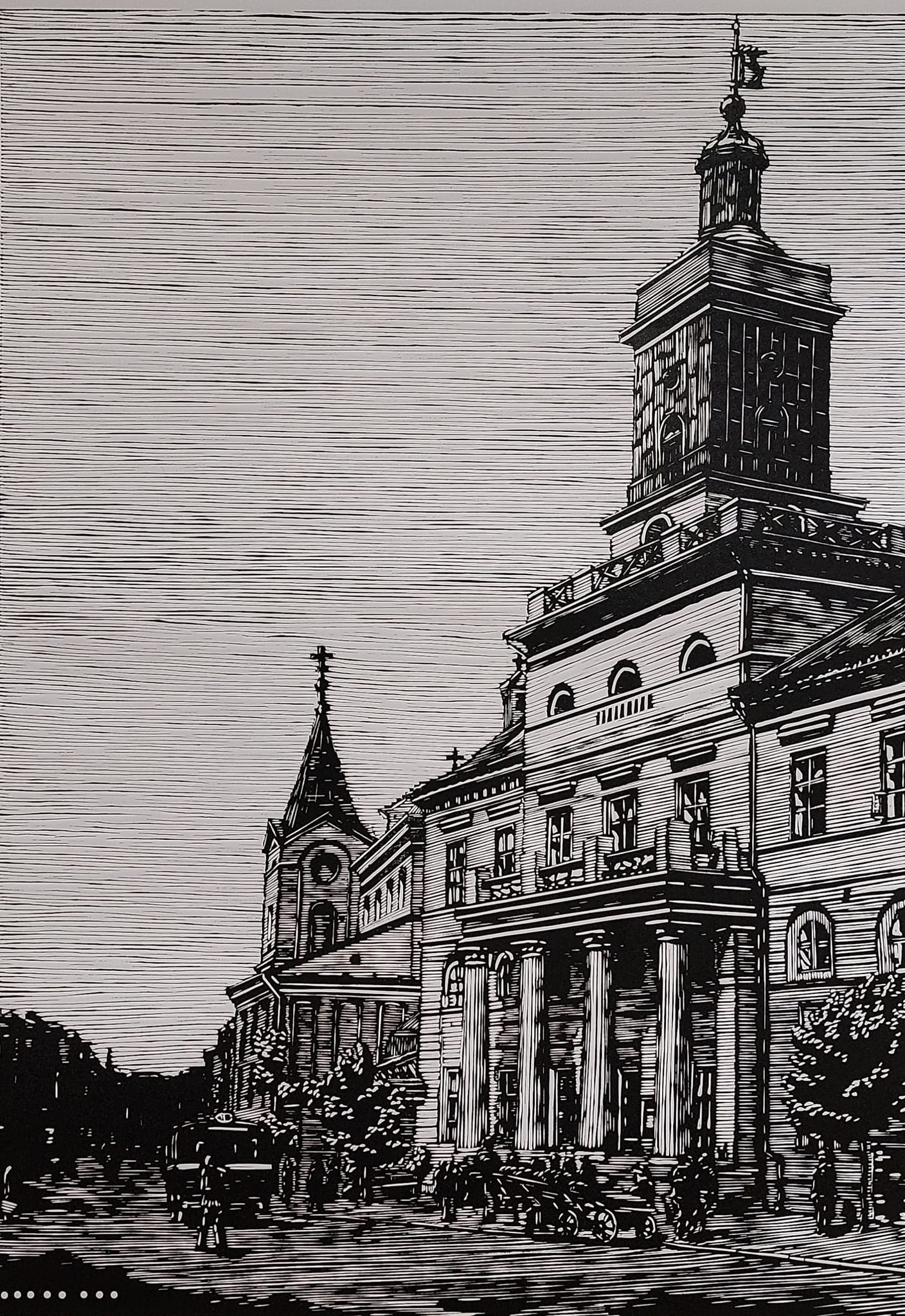
Lublin Town Hall (Polish: Lubelski ratusz); – (2022). Linocut on paper, 61 × 43 cm. Currently the town hall is a seat of the Historical Museum in Lubin, as well as the Governing Mayor and the City Council.
