= Jaszczów =

- Village
- Location within Poland
- Coordinates: 51°13′N 22°56′E
- Country: Poland
- Voivodeship: Lublin
- County: Łęczna
- Gmina: Milejów
- Population: 917

Jaszczów [ˈjaʂt͡ʂuf] is a village in the administrative district of Gmina Milejów, within Łęczna County, Lublin Voivodeship, in eastern Poland.

== Famous people born in Jaszczów ==
- Grzegorz Bronowicki (born 1980)
- Paweł Brodzisz (born 1975), a Polish painter, photographer, graphic artist, he is also a regionalist, focusing on the Lublin and Silesia regions.
- Wiesław Jan Krajka (born 1949)
