= Kajetanówka, Łęczna County =

Kajetanówka
- Village
- Location within Poland
- Coordinates: 51°14′22″N 22°53′03″E
- Country: Poland
- Voivodeship: Lublin
- County: Łęczna
- Gmina: Milejów
- Population: 153

Kajetanówka [kajɛtaˈnufka] is a village in the administrative district of Gmina Milejów, within Łęczna County, Lublin Voivodeship, in eastern Poland.
