= Whitford Garne =

Historic house in Pennsylvania, United States

- U.S. National Register of Historic Places
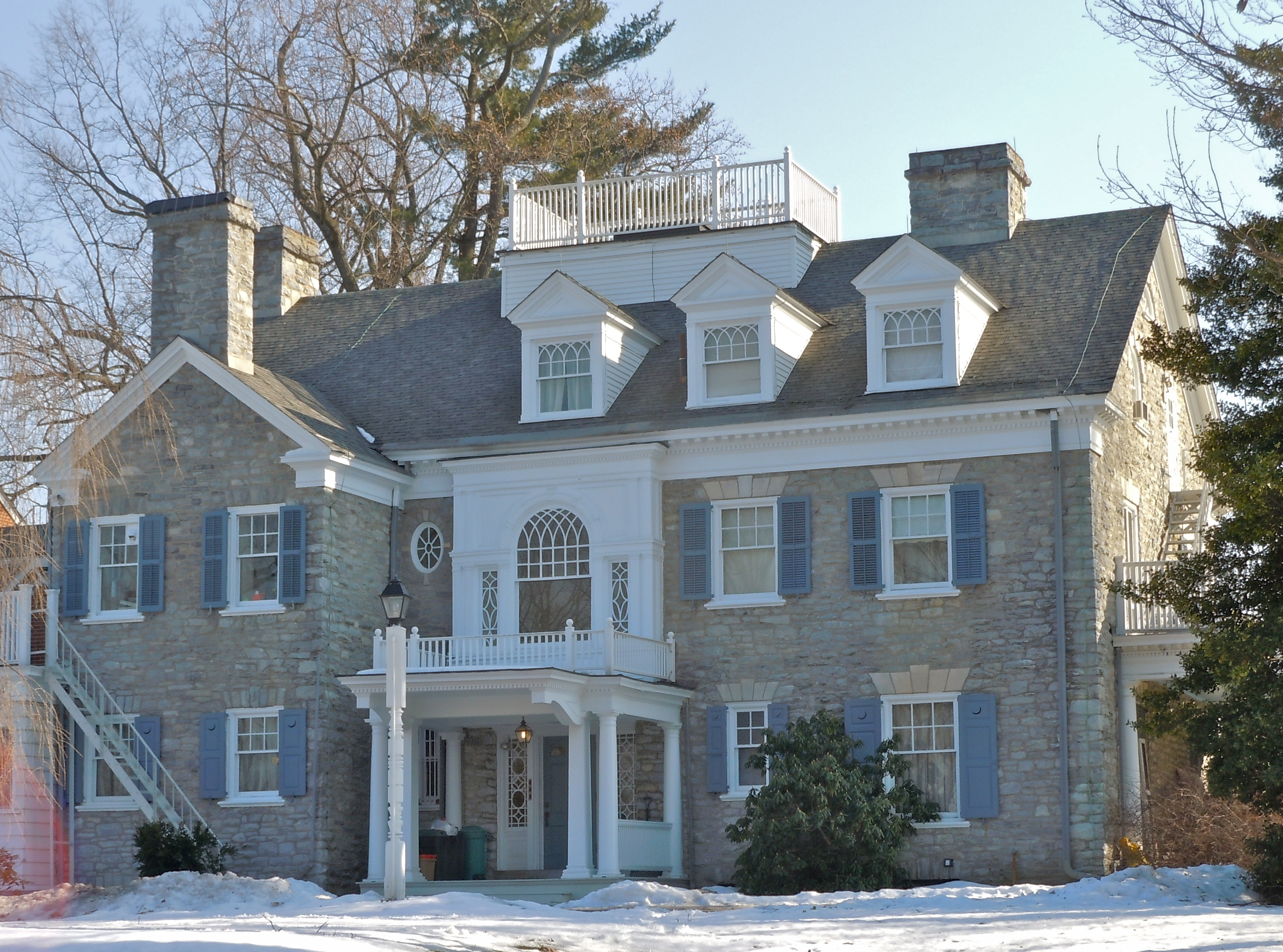
- Whitford Garn, February 2011

- Location within Pennsylvania Location within the United States
- Location: 201 W. Boot Rd., West Whiteland Township, Pennsylvania
- Coordinates: 40°0′46″N 75°37′34″W
- Area: 1.3 acres (0.53 ha)
- Built: 1905
- Architect: Dilkes, Albert W.
- Architectural style: Colonial Revival, Other, Georgian Revival
- MPS: West Whiteland Township MRA
- NRHP reference No.: 84003317
- Added to NRHP: September 6, 1984

Whitford Garne is a historic home located in West Whiteland Township, Chester County, Pennsylvania. The house was built in 1905, and is a 2 1/2-story, five-bay dwelling with a service wing in the Georgian Revival style. It has a gable roof with dormers and the front facade features a Palladian window. It is used for a pool and tennis club in a planned residential development.

It was listed on the National Register of Historic Places in 1984.
