= Garnes (surname) =

Garnes is a surname. Notable people with the surname include:

- Antoinette Garnes (about 1887–1938), American soprano singer
- Ayden Garnes (born 2003), American football player
- Chelen Garnes (born 2000), American football player
- JoLynn Garnes, American film editor
- Kåre Garnes (born 1954), Norwegian jazz musician
- Leo Garnes (born 1968), Barbadian long-distance runner
- Paul Garnes, American film and television producer
- Sam Garnes (born 1974), American football player
- Sherman Garnes (1940–1977), American singer

== See also ==
- Garne, another surname
