= Middle Aston =

Hamlet in Oxfordshire, England

Coordinates: 51.939°N 01.310°W

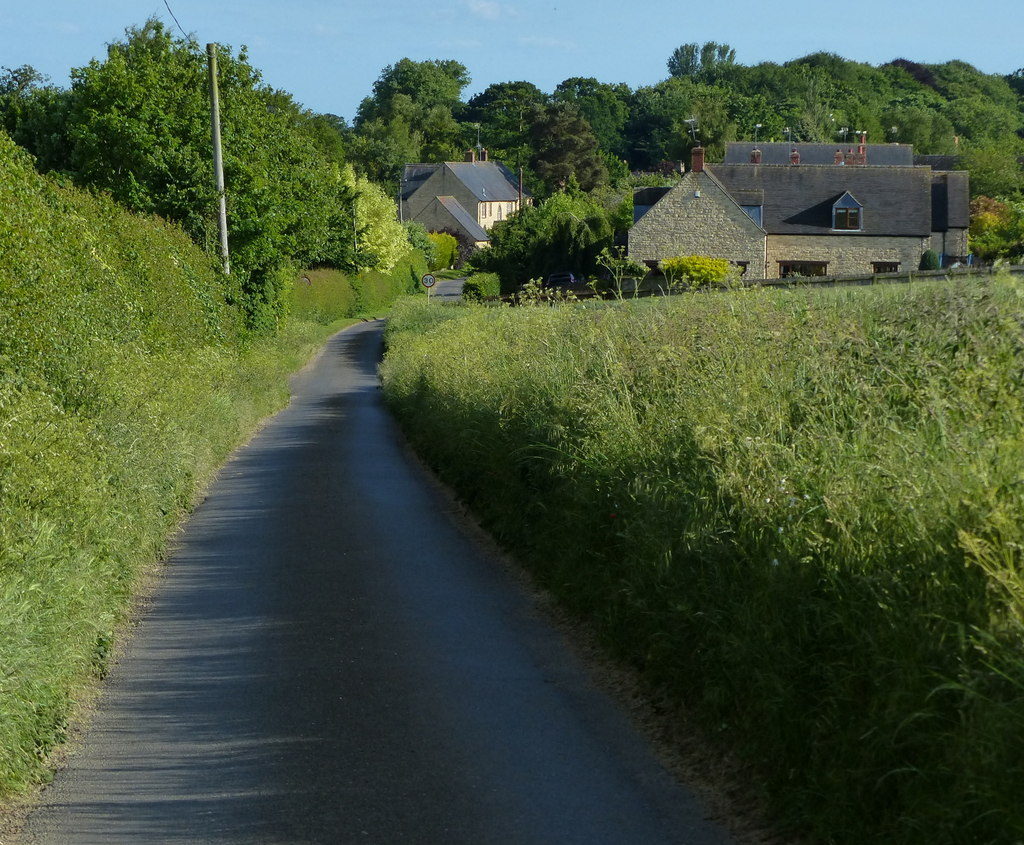
- Lane towards Middle Aston

- Location within Oxfordshire
- Population: 222 (2001 census)
- OS grid reference: SP4727
- Civil parish: Middle Aston
- District: Cherwell
- Shire county: Oxfordshire
- Region: South East
- Country: England
- Sovereign state: United Kingdom
- Post town: Bicester
- Postcode district: OX25
- Dialling code: 01869
- Police: Thames Valley
- Fire: Oxfordshire
- Ambulance: South Central
- UK Parliament: Banbury

Middle Aston is a hamlet and civil parish in the English county of Oxfordshire, about 7 miles (11 km) northwest of Bicester.

It used to have a country house, Middle Aston House, but this was demolished early in the 19th century. The house was replaced in the 1890s by extending the manor farmhouse. The building is now a conference center.

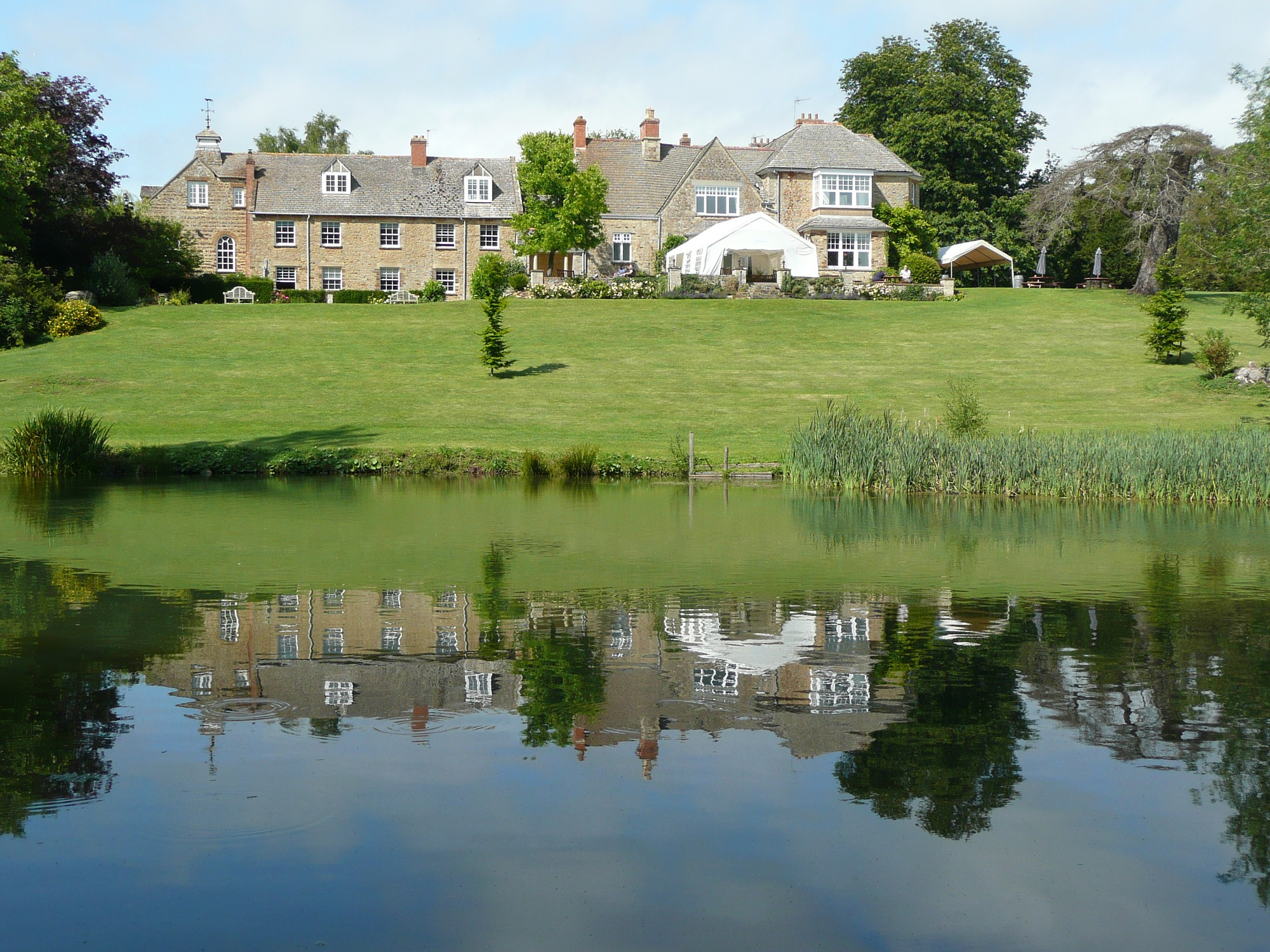
Middle Aston House (2011)

== History ==
=== Middle Ages ===
At the time of the Domesday Book survey of 1086 Middle Aston was split into four estates:

1. Goisbert held one hide under Robert de Stafford.
2. Gislebert held two hides and five eighths under Robert de Stafford.
3. Saric held one hide and a quarter under the King by sergeanty.
4. Hugh held one hide and an eighth in Hidrecote or Nidrecote under the Bishop of Bayeaux.

The two holdings held under Robert de Stafford were at some stage before the end of the 12th Century united to form the Middle Aston manor, which by 1279 also included the holding of Saric. The manor passed into the Brimpton family, from Brimpton in Berkshire who owned the village from the early 13th to late 14th centuries. They never lived in the parish, and a manor house was never attached to the estate. The village was the largest of the three Astons during this period. During the fifteenth century Middle Aston was owned by first the Stokes family and then the Dyneley family.

=== Nethercote ===
During the Middle Ages there was a small hamlet called Nethercote in the parish of Middle Aston. After the Domesday survey it was held as a separate estate. In 1257 it was conveyed by Thomas Buffyn to Chetwode Priory. The hamlet was abandoned during the time of the Black Death. The remaining farm, which was known as the Nethercote Grange, remained in the ownership of the church until the Dissolution of the Monasteries in 1536. It initially passed to the Fermors of Somerton, but by the early 17th century had become part of the Middle Aston manor.
