= Górne, Lublin Voivodeship =

Górne
- Village
- Location within Poland
- Coordinates: 51°15′04″N 22°52′45″E
- Country: Poland
- Voivodeship: Lublin
- County: Łęczna
- Gmina: Milejów
- Population: 196

Górne [ˈɡurnɛ] is a village in the administrative district of Gmina Milejów, within Łęczna County, Lublin Voivodeship, in eastern Poland.
