= Lysolaje (Prague) =

- Cadastral district of Prague
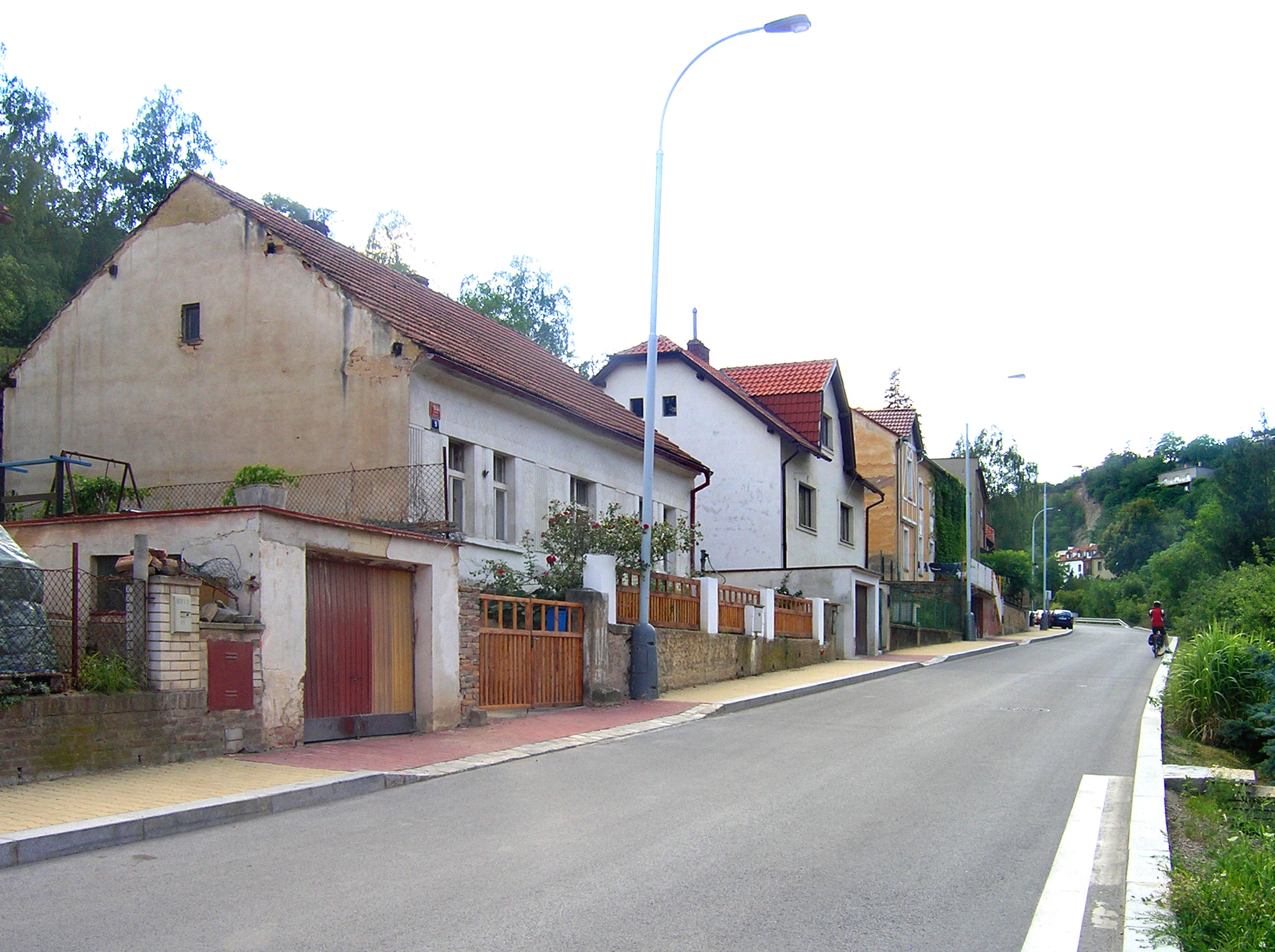

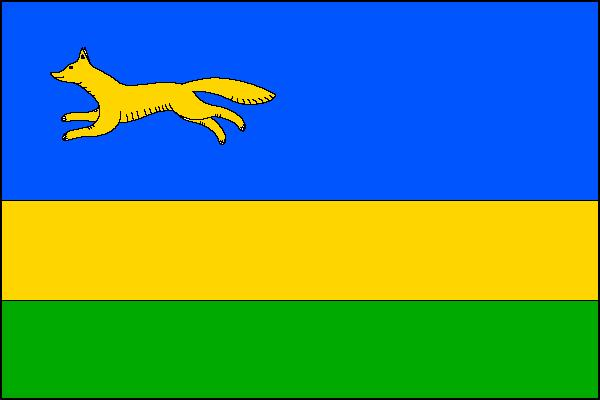
- Flag Coat of arms
- Interactive map of Lysolaje
- Coordinates: 50°7′28″N 14°22′18″E
- Country: Czech Republic
- Region: Prague
- District: Prague 16

Area
  - Total: 2.48 km^{2} (0.96 sq mi)

Population (2021)
  - Total: 1,484
  - Density: 598/km^{2} (1,550/sq mi)
- Time zone: UTC+1 (CET)
  - Summer (DST): UTC+2 (CEST)
- Postal code: 165 00
- Website: https://www.praha-lysolaje.cz/

Lysolaje (Czech pronunciation: [ˈlɪsolajɛ]; German: Lisolei) is a cadastral district of Prague, located in the north-east of the city, with a population of 1,484 as of the 2021 census. Lysolaje borders the cadastral areas of Suchdol to the north, Sedlec to the east and Dejvice to the south, and the village of Horoměřice to the west.

== History ==
The area of Lysolaje has been settled since prehistoric times, and the modern settlement dates to at least the 13th century, when it was a farming village. Ottokar I dedicated the lands to the St. Wenceslas Chapel at Prague Castle. From the 16th century, the village was also used for wine-making. The last landowner of the village before it became self-governing in the 19th century was the Supreme Burgrave of the Kingdom of Bohemia.

Lysolaje became part of Prague in 1968, and became a cadastral district on 24 November 1990. Today it forms part of a wildlife corridor on the edge of the city.

== Demographics ==
Historical population
Year	Pop.	±%
1869	452	—
1880	522	+15.5%
1890	636	+21.8%
1900	697	+9.6%
1910	948	+36.0%
1921	990	+4.4%
1930	1,333	+34.6%
1950	1,115	−16.4%
1961	1,188	+6.5%
1970	1,092	−8.1%
1980	929	−14.9%
1991	769	−17.2%
2001	810	+5.3%
2011	1,541	+90.2%
2021	1,484	−3.7%
Source: Censuses

== Notable people ==
- Eliška Krásnohorská, lived here from 1862 to 1867.
