= Łysołaje =

- Village
- Location within Poland
- Coordinates: 51°11′30″N 22°56′22″E
- Country: Poland
- Voivodeship: Lublin
- County: Łęczna
- Gmina: Milejów
- Population: 390

Łysołaje [wɨsɔˈwajɛ] is a village in the administrative district of Gmina Milejów, within Łęczna County, Lublin Voivodeship, in eastern Poland.
