= Lipniak =

Lipniak may refer to the following villages in Poland:

- Lipniak, Gmina Kock in Lublin Voivodeship (east Poland)
- Lipniak, Gmina Michów in Lublin Voivodeship (east Poland)
- Lipniak, Lublin County in Lublin Voivodeship (east Poland)
- Lipniak, Łuków County in Lublin Voivodeship (east Poland)
- Lipniak, Parczew County in Lublin Voivodeship (east Poland)
- Lipniak, Masovian Voivodeship (east-central Poland)
- Lipniak, Warmian-Masurian Voivodeship (north Poland)
- Lipniak, Gmina Suwałki in Podlaskie Voivodeship (north-east Poland)
- Lipniak, Gmina Szypliszki in Podlaskie Voivodeship (north-east Poland)
