= Tarło =

Tarło or Tarlo may refer to:

== Places ==
- Tarło, Lublin Voivodeship, Poland
- Tarło-Kolonia, Lublin Voivodeship, Poland
- Tarlo, New South Wales, Australia
- Tarlo River, New South Wales, Australia
  - Tarlo River National Park

== People ==
- Tarło (surname)
- Tarło family, a Polish noble family
