= Rudzienko =

Rudzienko may refer to:

- Rudzienko, Lublin Voivodeship (east Poland)
- Rudzienko, Mińsk County in Masovian Voivodeship (east-central Poland)
- Rudzienko, Otwock County in Masovian Voivodeship (east-central Poland)
- Rudzienko-Kolonia
