= Jeziorzany, Lublin Voivodeship =

Village in Lublin Voivodeship, Poland

Jeziorzany
- Village
- Location within Poland
- Coordinates: 51°36′8″N 22°16′37″E
- Country: Poland
- Voivodeship: Lublin
- County: Lubartów
- Gmina: Jeziorzany
- Elevation: 130 m (430 ft)
- Population (2011): 761
- Time zone: UTC+1 (CET)
  - Summer (DST): UTC+2 (CEST)
- Postal code: 21-146
- Area code: +48 81
- Car plates: LLB

Jeziorzany (Polish: [jɛʑɔˈʐanɨ]), until 1965 called Łysobyki (Polish: [wɨsɔˈbɨki]), is a village in Lubartów County, Lublin Voivodeship, in eastern Poland. It is the seat of its gmina, Gmina Jeziorzany. The village has a population of 761.

== History ==
Originally, during the time of the Polish-Lithuanian Commonwealth, it was part of the village of Przytoczno in Stężyca Land, Sandomierz Voivodeship. In 1498, at the request of its landowner, Mikołaj of Ostrów, King John I Albert issued a privilege granting it town rights under the Magdeburg law. The town received permission to organize three fairs a year, a street market every few weeks, and to set up guilds for its burghers. However, the incorporation of the city failed, probably due to insufficient funds or the Tatar invasion in 1502.

In 1530, King Sigismund I the Old gave the next landowner, Łukasz Zbąski, a confirmation of the old privilege. This enabled him to establish in 1533 a town called New Przytoczno on Wieliska, an island on the Wieprz. The name Łysobyki appeared in documents as early as 1564; however, until the end of the 16th century it was used alongside its former name. The Zbąski family established a Calvinist congregation there which existed as late as 1629, when Krzysztof Muzoniusz was mentioned as a pastor. The sixteenth-century street layout from that period has been preserved, with wooden houses with decorated shutters and porches.

After the Partitions, Łysobyki belonged to the Russian-controlled Congress Poland. A parish church was built there in 1797. In 1827, the town had 133 houses and 930 inhabitants. In 1831, during the November Uprising, a skirmish between Polish troops led by General Antoni Jankowski and Russian units took place there. The town was destroyed by a fire in 1859. In 1862 it had 62 houses and 1013 inhabitants, 356 of which were Jewish. In 1870 the Russians stripped Łysobyki of its town rights as part of repressions after the January Uprising. By the end of the 19th century it had a primary school, a commune office, 116 houses, and 1112 inhabitants. In 1915, retreating Russian troops set fire to the village, which mostly destroyed it.

During World War II, in 1942, Germans performed a mass execution of elderly and disabled Jewish residents south of the village, next to a road to Michów. Most of the remaining Jews were first resettled to Łuków and Michów, then to the Sobibór extermination camp.

In 1965, the name of the village was changed to Jeziorzany.
