= Klementynów, Lublin Voivodeship =

Klementynów
- Village
- Location within Poland
- Coordinates: 51°30′51″N 22°40′30″E
- Country: Poland
- Voivodeship: Lublin
- County: Lubartów
- Gmina: Niedźwiada
- Population: 130

Klementynów [klɛmɛnˈtɨnuf] is a village in the administrative district of Gmina Niedźwiada, within Lubartów County, Lublin Voivodeship, in eastern Poland.

The village is situated northeast of the crossroad intersection of Voivodeship roads DW815 and DW821, and County road 1253L.
