= Wola Blizocka =

- Village
- Location within Poland
- Coordinates: 51°37′N 22°15′E
- Country: Poland
- Voivodeship: Lublin
- County: Lubartów
- Gmina: Jeziorzany

Wola Blizocka [ˈvɔla bliˈzɔt͡ska] is a village in the administrative district of Gmina Jeziorzany, within Lubartów County, Lublin Voivodeship, in eastern Poland.
