= Brzostówka =

- Village
- Location within Poland
- Coordinates: 51°26′06″N 22°46′42″E
- Country: Poland
- Voivodeship: Lublin
- County: Lubartów
- Gmina: Serniki

Population (approx.)
  - Total: 733
- Time zone: UTC+1 (CET)
  - Summer (DST): UTC+2 (CEST)

Brzostówka [bʐɔsˈtufka] is a village in the administrative district of Gmina Serniki, within Lubartów County, Lublin Voivodeship, in eastern Poland.

== History ==
Nine Polish citizens were murdered by Nazi Germany in the village during World War II.
