= Blizocin, Lublin Voivodeship =

Blizocin
- Village
- Location within Poland
- Coordinates: 51°36′N 22°13′E
- Country: Poland
- Voivodeship: Lublin
- County: Lubartów
- Gmina: Jeziorzany

Blizocin [bliˈzɔt͡ɕin] is a village in the administrative district of Gmina Jeziorzany, within Lubartów County, Lublin Voivodeship, in eastern Poland.
