= Czerniejów, Lubartów County =

Czerniejów
- Village
- Location within Poland
- Coordinates: 51°24′14″N 22°42′04″E
- Country: Poland
- Voivodeship: Lublin
- County: Lubartów
- Gmina: Serniki

Czerniejów [t͡ʂɛrˈɲɛjuf] is a village in the administrative district of Gmina Serniki, within Lubartów County, Lublin Voivodeship, in eastern Poland.
