= Annówka, Lublin Voivodeship =

Annówka
- Village
- Location within Poland
- Coordinates: 51°40′N 22°28′E
- Country: Poland
- Voivodeship: Lublin
- County: Lubartów
- Gmina: Kock

Annówka [anˈnufka] is a village in the administrative district of Gmina Kock, within Lubartów County, Lublin Voivodeship, in eastern Poland.
