= Serniki-Kolonia =

- Village
- Location within Poland
- Coordinates: 51°25′48″N 22°40′01″E
- Country: Poland
- Voivodeship: Lublin
- County: Lubartów
- Gmina: Serniki

Serniki-Kolonia [sɛrˈniki kɔˈlɔɲa] is a village in the administrative district of Gmina Serniki, within Lubartów County, Lublin Voivodeship, in eastern Poland.
