= Ochoża, Lubartów County =

Ochoża
- Village
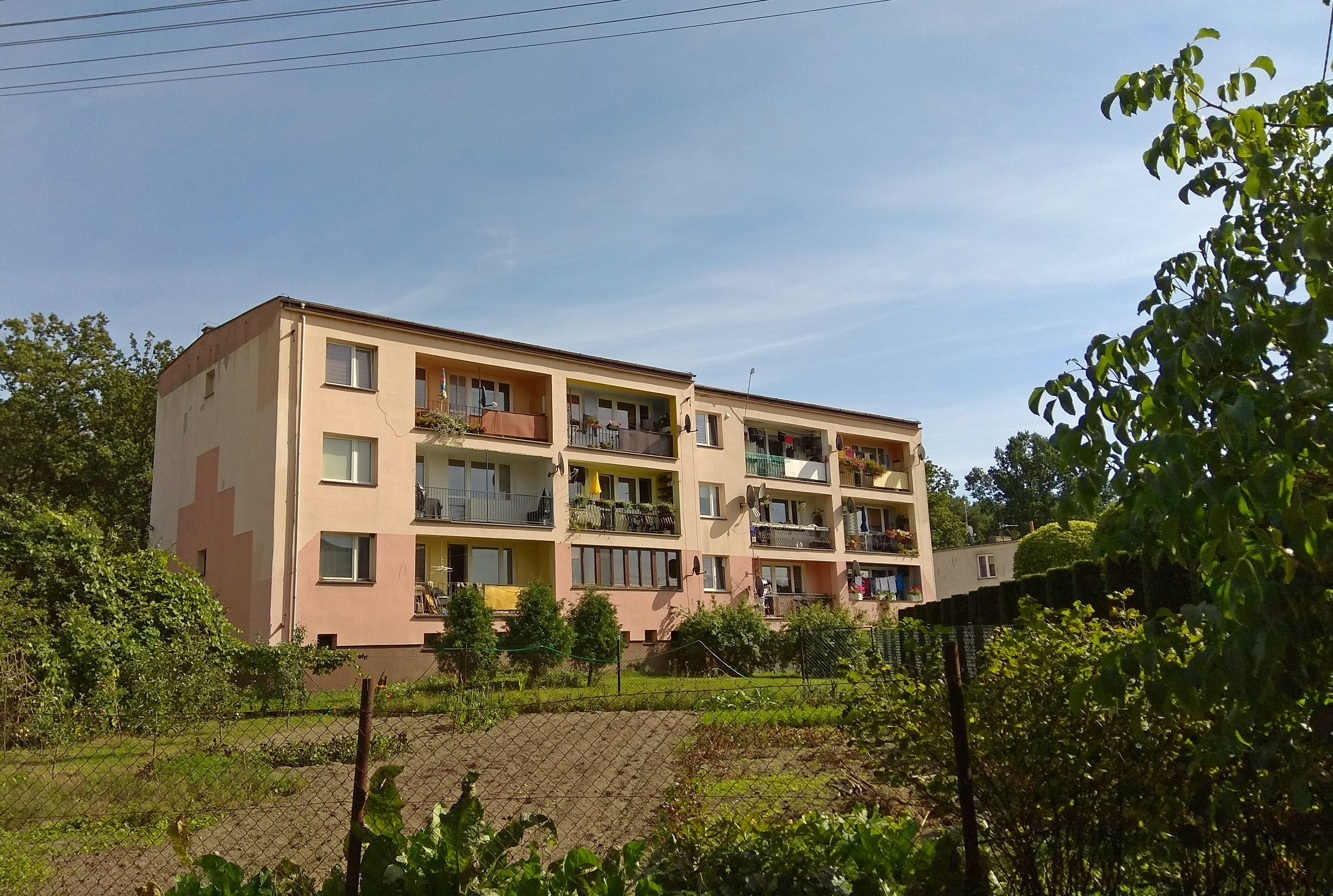

- Location within Poland
- Coordinates: 51°33′13″N 22°54′48″E
- Country: Poland
- Voivodeship: Lublin
- County: Lubartów
- Gmina: Uścimów

Ochoża [ɔˈxɔʐa] is a village in the administrative district of Gmina Uścimów, within Lubartów County, Lublin Voivodeship, in eastern Poland.
