= Kolonia Giżyce =

- Village
- Location within Poland
- Coordinates: 51°35′N 22°22′E
- Country: Poland
- Voivodeship: Lublin
- County: Lubartów
- Gmina: Michów

Kolonia Giżyce [kɔˈlɔɲa ɡiˈʐɨt͡sɛ] is a village in the administrative district of Gmina Michów, within Lubartów County, Lublin Voivodeship, in eastern Poland.
