= Pałecznica, Lublin Voivodeship =

Pałecznica
- Village
- Location within Poland
- Coordinates: 51°29′N 22°40′E
- Country: Poland
- Voivodeship: Lublin
- County: Lubartów
- Gmina: Niedźwiada

Pałecznica [pawɛt͡ʂˈnit͡sa] is a village in the administrative district of Gmina Niedźwiada, within Lubartów County, Lublin Voivodeship, in eastern Poland.
