= Zabiele, Lubartów County =

Zabiele
- Village
- Location within Poland
- Coordinates: 51°32′7″N 22°46′12″E
- Country: Poland
- Voivodeship: Lublin
- County: Lubartów
- Gmina: Niedźwiada

Zabiele [zaˈbjɛlɛ] is a village in the administrative district of Gmina Niedźwiada, within Lubartów County, Lublin Voivodeship, in eastern Poland.
