= Natalin, Lubartów County =

Natalin
- Village
- Location within Poland
- Coordinates: 51°30′11″N 22°16′17″E
- Country: Poland
- Voivodeship: Lublin
- County: Lubartów
- Gmina: Michów

Natalin [naˈtalin] is a village in the administrative district of Gmina Michów, within Lubartów County, Lublin Voivodeship, in eastern Poland.
