= Chudowola, Lublin Voivodeship =

Chudowola
- Village
- Location within Poland
- Coordinates: 51°34′N 22°19′E
- Country: Poland
- Voivodeship: Lublin
- County: Lubartów
- Gmina: Michów

Chudowola [xudɔˈvɔla] is a village in the administrative district of Gmina Michów, within Lubartów County, Lublin Voivodeship, in eastern Poland.
