= Górka Lubartowska =

- Village
- Location within Poland
- Coordinates: 51°31′N 22°38′E
- Country: Poland
- Voivodeship: Lublin
- County: Lubartów
- Gmina: Niedźwiada
- Population: 600

Górka Lubartowska [ˈɡurka lubarˈtɔfska] is a village in the administrative district of Gmina Niedźwiada, within Lubartów County, Lublin Voivodeship, in eastern Poland.
