= Trzciniec, Gmina Michów =

Trzciniec
- Village
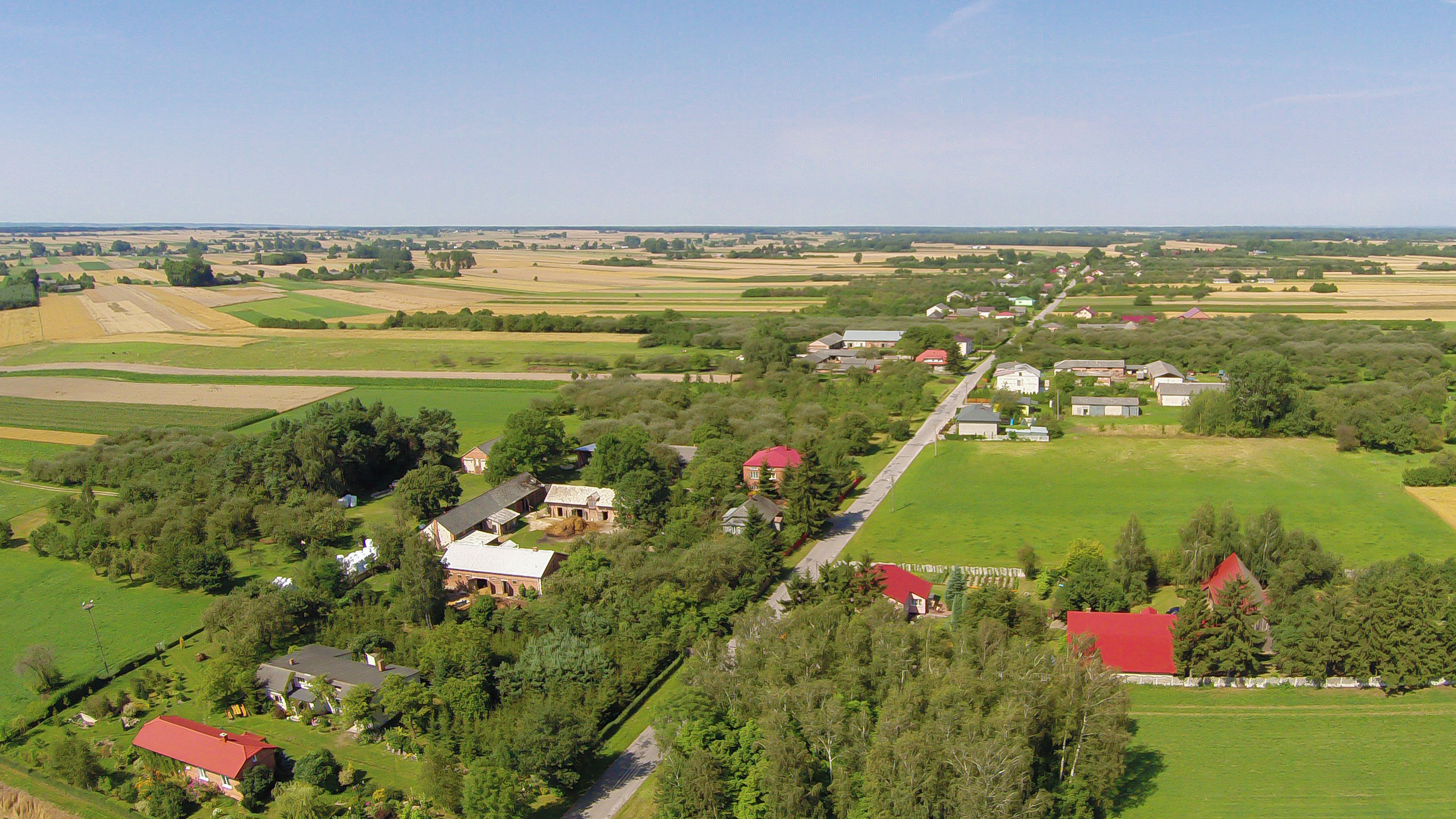

- Location within Poland
- Coordinates: 51°29′43″N 22°17′28″E
- Country: Poland
- Voivodeship: Lublin
- County: Lubartów
- Gmina: Michów

Trzciniec [ˈtʂt͡ɕiɲɛt͡s] is a village in the administrative district of Gmina Michów, within Lubartów County, Lublin Voivodeship, in eastern Poland.
