= Walentynów, Lubartów County =

Walentynów
- Village
- Location within Poland
- Coordinates: 51°38′56″N 22°12′12″E
- Country: Poland
- Voivodeship: Lublin
- County: Lubartów
- Gmina: Jeziorzany

Walentynów [valɛnˈtɨnuf] is a village in the administrative district of Gmina Jeziorzany, within Lubartów County, Lublin Voivodeship, in eastern Poland.
