= Meszno =

Meszno may refer to the following places:

- Meszno, Lubartów County in Lublin Voivodeship (east Poland)
- Meszno, Lublin County in Lublin Voivodeship (east Poland)
- Meszno, Opole Voivodeship (south-west Poland)
- Meszno, Warmian-Masurian Voivodeship (north Poland)
