= Stawik, Lublin Voivodeship =

Stawik
- Village
- Location within Poland
- Coordinates: 51°34′46″N 22°15′52″E
- Country: Poland
- Voivodeship: Lublin
- County: Lubartów
- Gmina: Jeziorzany

Stawik [ˈstavik] is a village in the administrative district of Gmina Jeziorzany, within Lubartów County, Lublin Voivodeship, in eastern Poland.
