= Gołąb-Kolonia =

- Village
- Location within Poland
- Coordinates: 51°29′29″N 22°22′19″E
- Country: Poland
- Voivodeship: Lublin
- County: Lubartów
- Gmina: Michów

Gołąb-Kolonia [ˈɡɔwɔmp kɔˈlɔɲa] is a village in the administrative district of Gmina Michów, within Lubartów County, Lublin Voivodeship, in eastern Poland.
