= Nowa Wola, Lublin Voivodeship =

Nowa Wola
- Village
- Location within Poland
- Coordinates: 51°25′3″N 22°43′25″E
- Country: Poland
- Voivodeship: Lublin
- County: Lubartów
- Gmina: Serniki

Nowa Wola [ˈnɔva ˈvɔla] is a village in the administrative district of Gmina Serniki, within Lubartów County, Lublin Voivodeship, in eastern Poland.
