= Ostrów, Lubartów County =

Ostrów
- Village
- Location within Poland
- Coordinates: 51°35′23″N 22°19′31″E
- Country: Poland
- Voivodeship: Lublin
- County: Lubartów
- Gmina: Michów
- Population: 140

Ostrów [ˈɔstruf] is a village in the administrative district of Gmina Michów, within Lubartów County, Lublin Voivodeship, in eastern Poland.
