= Maśluchy =

- Village
- Location within Poland
- Coordinates: 51°26′54″N 22°57′13″E
- Country: Poland
- Voivodeship: Lublin
- County: Lubartów
- Gmina: Uścimów

Maśluchy [maˈɕluxɨ] is a village in the administrative district of Gmina Uścimów, within Lubartów County, Lublin Voivodeship, in eastern Poland.
