= Ruska Wieś, Lublin Voivodeship =

Ruska Wieś
- Village
- Location within Poland
- Coordinates: 51°37′N 22°25′E
- Country: Poland
- Voivodeship: Lublin
- County: Lubartów
- Gmina: Kock

Ruska Wieś [ˈruska ˈvjɛɕ] is a village in the administrative district of Gmina Kock, within Lubartów County, Lublin Voivodeship, in eastern Poland.
