= Drozdówka, Lublin Voivodeship =

Drozdówka
- Village
- Location within Poland
- Coordinates: 51°29′50.60″N 22°57′31.59″E
- Country: Poland
- Voivodeship: Lublin
- County: Lubartów
- Gmina: Uścimów

Drozdówka [drɔzˈdufka] is a village in the administrative district of Gmina Uścimów, within Lubartów County, Lublin Voivodeship, in eastern Poland.
