= Pałecznica-Kolonia =

- Village
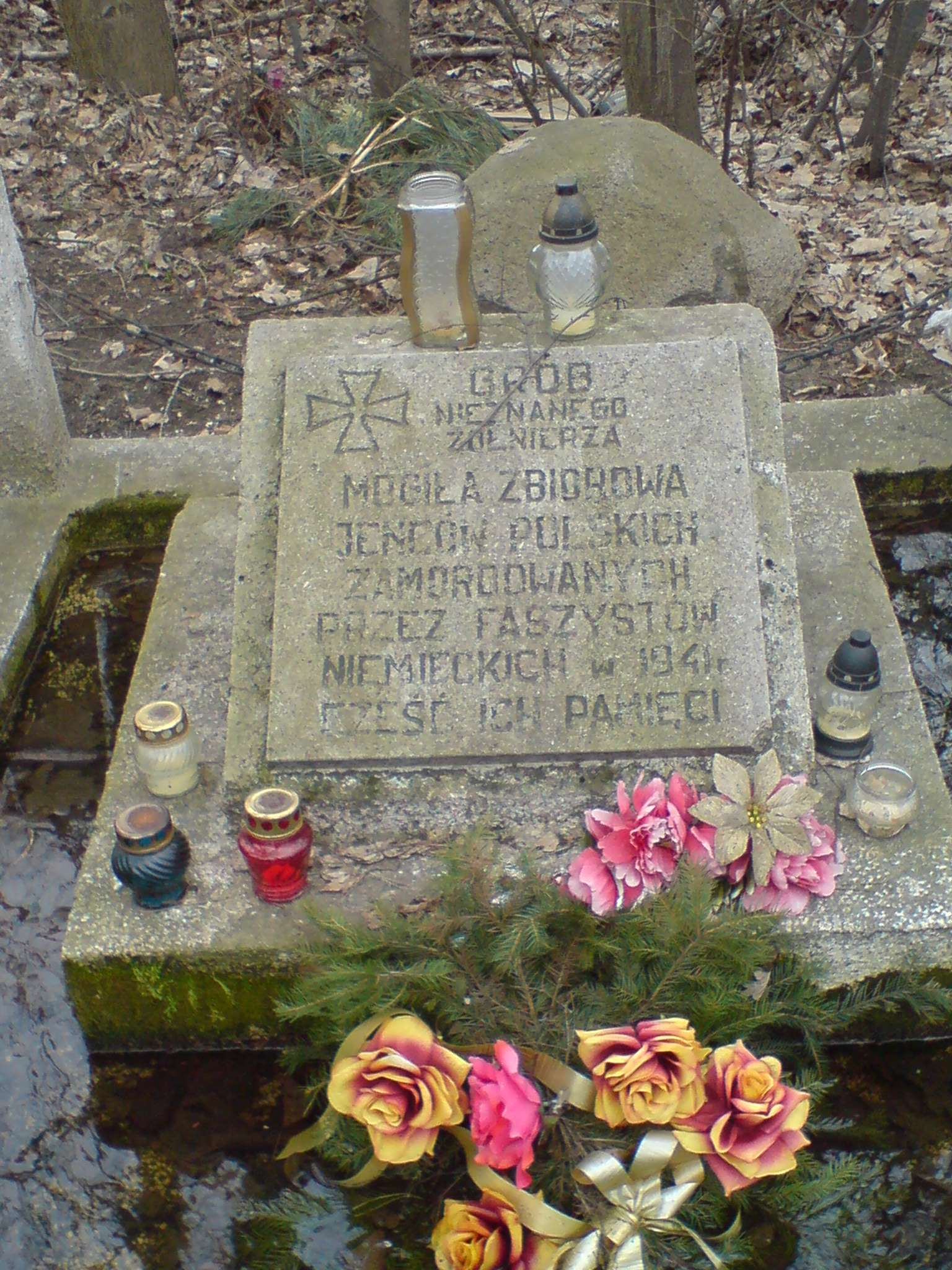
- Cemetery in Pałecznica-Kolonia

- Location within Poland
- Coordinates: 51°29′55″N 22°39′23″E
- Country: Poland
- Voivodeship: Lublin
- County: Lubartów
- Gmina: Niedźwiada

Pałecznica-Kolonia [pawɛt͡ʂˈnit͡sa kɔˈlɔɲa] is a village in the administrative district of Gmina Niedźwiada, within Lubartów County, Lublin Voivodeship, in eastern Poland.
