= Brzeźnica Książęca-Kolonia =

- Village
- Location within Poland
- Coordinates: 51°33′35″N 22°42′57″E
- Country: Poland
- Voivodeship: Lublin
- County: Lubartów
- Gmina: Niedźwiada
- Population: 382

Brzeźnica Książęca-Kolonia [bʐɛʑˈnit͡sa kɕɔ̃ˈʐɛnt͡sa kɔˈlɔɲa] is a village in the administrative district of Gmina Niedźwiada, within Lubartów County, Lublin Voivodeship, in eastern Poland.
