= Kruszyna, Lublin Voivodeship =

Kruszyna
- Village
- Location within Poland
- Coordinates: 51°34′14″N 22°14′36″E
- Country: Poland
- Voivodeship: Lublin
- County: Lubartów
- Gmina: Michów

Kruszyna [kruˈʂɨna] is a village in the administrative district of Gmina Michów, within Lubartów County, Lublin Voivodeship, in eastern Poland.
