= Talczyn =

- Village
- Location within Poland
- Coordinates: 51°41′N 22°24′E
- Country: Poland
- Voivodeship: Lublin
- County: Lubartów
- Gmina: Kock

Talczyn [ˈtalt͡ʂɨn] is a village in the administrative district of Gmina Kock, within Lubartów County, Lublin Voivodeship, in eastern Poland.
