= Zabiele-Kolonia =

- Village
- Location within Poland
- Coordinates: 51°32′43″N 22°45′27″E
- Country: Poland
- Voivodeship: Lublin
- County: Lubartów
- Gmina: Niedźwiada
- Population: 186

Zabiele-Kolonia [zaˈbjɛlɛ kɔˈlɔɲa] is a village in the administrative district of Gmina Niedźwiada, within Lubartów County, Lublin Voivodeship, in eastern Poland.
