= Miastkówek =

- Village
- Location within Poland
- Coordinates: 51°33′N 22°16′E
- Country: Poland
- Voivodeship: Lublin
- County: Lubartów
- Gmina: Michów

Miastkówek [mjastˈkuvɛk] is a village in the administrative district of Gmina Michów, within Lubartów County, Lublin Voivodeship, in eastern Poland.
