= Skarbiciesz =

- Village
- Location within Poland
- Coordinates: 51°37′N 22°20′E
- Country: Poland
- Voivodeship: Lublin
- County: Lubartów
- Gmina: Jeziorzany

Skarbiciesz [skarˈbit͡ɕɛʂ] is a village in the administrative district of Gmina Jeziorzany, within Lubartów County, Lublin Voivodeship, in eastern Poland.
