= Wólka Zabłocka, Lubartów County =

Wólka Zabłocka
- Village
- Location within Poland
- Coordinates: 51°28′N 22°44′E
- Country: Poland
- Voivodeship: Lublin
- County: Lubartów
- Gmina: Serniki

Wólka Zabłocka [ˈvulka zaˈbwɔt͡ska] is a village in the administrative district of Gmina Serniki, within Lubartów County, Lublin Voivodeship, in eastern Poland.
