= Krasne, Lubartów County =

Krasne
- Village
- Location within Poland
- Coordinates: 51°25′14″N 22°57′22″E
- Country: Poland
- Voivodeship: Lublin
- County: Lubartów
- Gmina: Uścimów
- Population (approx.): 550

Krasne [ˈkrasnɛ] is a village in the administrative district of Gmina Uścimów, within Lubartów County, Lublin Voivodeship, in eastern Poland.
