= Nowa Wieś, Lubartów County =

Nowa Wieś
- Village
- Location within Poland
- Coordinates: 51°27′N 22°45′E
- Country: Poland
- Voivodeship: Lublin
- County: Lubartów
- Gmina: Serniki
- Population (approx.): 250

Nowa Wieś [ˈnɔva ˈvjɛɕ] is a village in the administrative district of Gmina Serniki, within Lubartów County, Lublin Voivodeship, in eastern Poland.
