= Stoczek Kocki =

- Village
- Location within Poland
- Coordinates: 51°37′59″N 22°19′44″E
- Country: Poland
- Voivodeship: Lublin
- County: Lubartów
- Gmina: Jeziorzany

Stoczek Kocki [ˈstɔt͡ʂɛk ˈkɔt͡ski] is a village in the administrative district of Gmina Jeziorzany, within Lubartów County, Lublin Voivodeship, in eastern Poland.
