= Wypnicha =

- Village
- Location within Poland
- Coordinates: 51°29′N 22°21′E
- Country: Poland
- Voivodeship: Lublin
- County: Lubartów
- Gmina: Michów
- Population: 240

Wypnicha [vɨpˈnixa] is a village in the administrative district of Gmina Michów, within Lubartów County, Lublin Voivodeship, in eastern Poland.
