= Wola Sernicka-Kolonia =

- Village
- Location within Poland
- Coordinates: 51°26′44″N 22°43′08″E
- Country: Poland
- Voivodeship: Lublin
- County: Lubartów
- Gmina: Serniki

Wola Sernicka-Kolonia [ˈvɔla sɛrˈnit͡ska kɔˈlɔɲa] is a village in the administrative district of Gmina Serniki, within Lubartów County, Lublin Voivodeship, in eastern Poland.
