= Rawa =

Rawa may refer to:

== Places ==
=== Poland ===
- Rawa Mazowiecka, a town
- Rawa (river)
- Rawa County
- Rawa, Lublin Voivodeship, a village

=== Other places ===
- Rawa, India
- Rawa, Iraq, a town in Iraq
- Rawa Aopa Watumohai National Park, on the Indonesian island of Sulawesi
- Rawa Island, in Malaysia
- Rava-Ruska, Ukraine

== Other ==
- Revolutionary Association of the Women of Afghanistan
- Rawa people, an ethnic group in Southeast Asia
- Rawa, Ravva or Bombay rava, broken rice
- Rawa language, a Finisterre language of Papua New Guinea
- Recovering America's Wildlife Act, proposed American law

== People ==
- Rawa (Mossi), founder of the Mossi kingdom of Yatenga
- Richard A. Watson (born 1971), programmer and game designer for the Myst series of computer games

== See also ==
- Battle of Rawa, a World War I battle
- Rawa Blues Festival, at Spodek, Poland
