= Giżyce =

Giżyce may refer to the following places:

- Giżyce, Greater Poland Voivodeship (west-central Poland)
- Giżyce, Lublin Voivodeship (east Poland)
- Giżyce, Masovian Voivodeship (east-central Poland)
