= Wola Sernicka =

- Village
- Location within Poland
- Coordinates: 51°27′N 22°40′E
- Country: Poland
- Voivodeship: Lublin
- County: Lubartów
- Gmina: Serniki

Wola Sernicka [ˈvɔla sɛrˈnit͡ska] is a village in the administrative district of Gmina Serniki, within Lubartów County, Lublin Voivodeship, in eastern Poland.
