= Nowa Jedlanka =

- Village
- Location within Poland
- Coordinates: 51°30′18″N 22°55′02″E
- Country: Poland
- Voivodeship: Lublin
- County: Lubartów
- Gmina: Uścimów

Nowa Jedlanka [ˈnɔva jɛdˈlaŋka] is a village in the administrative district of Gmina Uścimów, within Lubartów County, Lublin Voivodeship, in eastern Poland.
