= Krupy =

Krupy may refer to the following places:

- Krupy, Lublin Voivodeship (east Poland)
- Krupy, Masovian Voivodeship (east-central Poland)
- Krupy, West Pomeranian Voivodeship (north-west Poland)
