= Gołąb, Lubartów County =

Gołąb
- Village
- Location within Poland
- Coordinates: 51°30′N 22°23′E
- Country: Poland
- Voivodeship: Lublin
- County: Lubartów
- Gmina: Michów

Gołąb [ˈɡɔwɔmp] is a village in the administrative district of Gmina Michów, within Lubartów County, Lublin Voivodeship, in eastern Poland.
