= Orzechów-Kolonia =

- Village
- Location within Poland
- Coordinates: 51°29′14″N 22°59′21″E
- Country: Poland
- Voivodeship: Lublin
- County: Lubartów
- Gmina: Uścimów

Orzechów-Kolonia [ɔˈʐɛxuf kɔˈlɔɲa] is a village in the administrative district of Gmina Uścimów, within Lubartów County, Lublin Voivodeship, in eastern Poland.
