= Wygnanka, Lubartów County =

Wygnanka
- Village
- Location within Poland
- Coordinates: 51°39′07″N 22°23′02″E
- Country: Poland
- Voivodeship: Lublin
- County: Lubartów
- Gmina: Kock

Wygnanka [vɨɡˈnaŋka] is a village in the administrative district of Gmina Kock, within Lubartów County, Lublin Voivodeship, in eastern Poland.
