= Kostopil =

City in Rivne Oblast, Ukraine

Kostopil Костопіль
- City
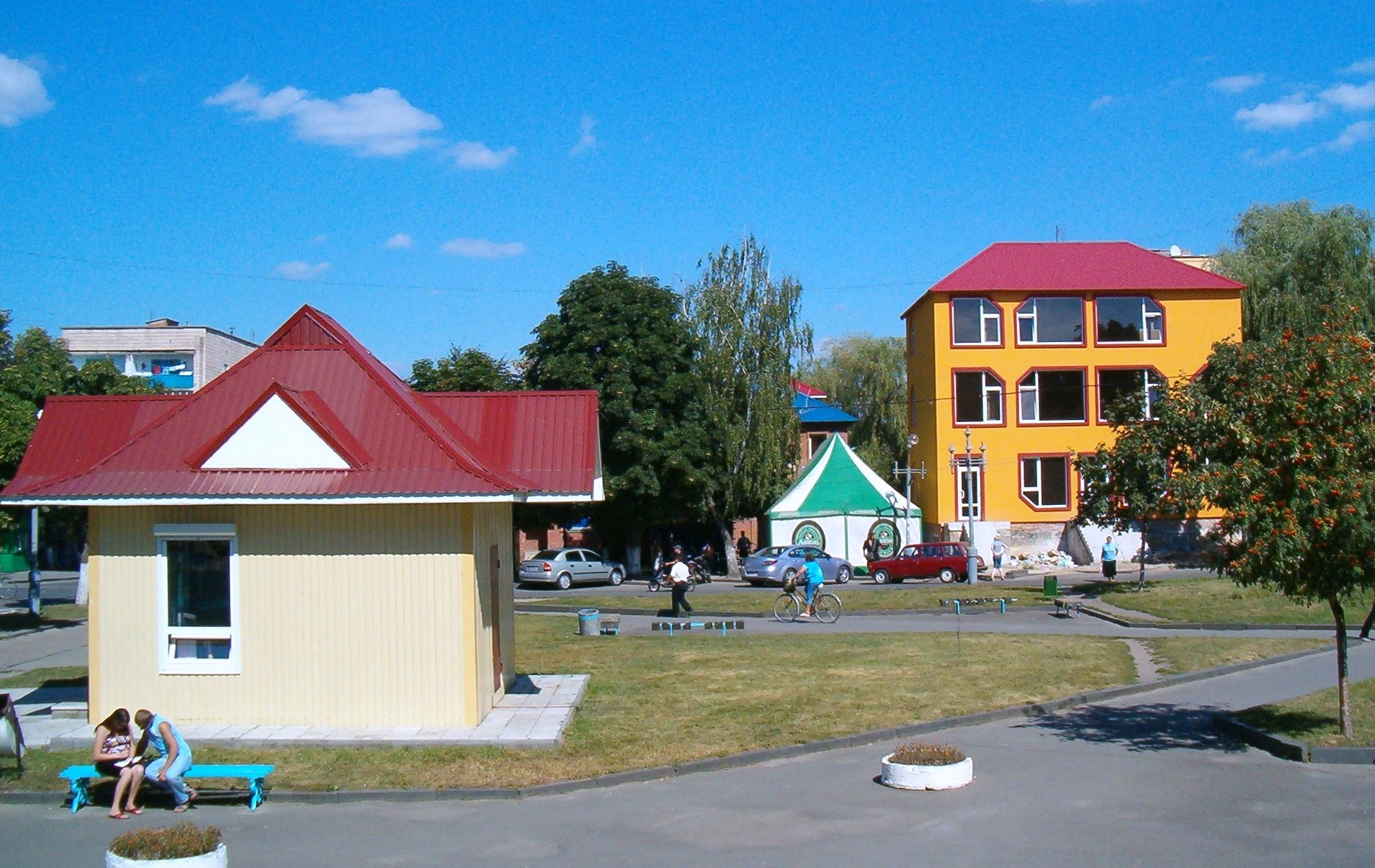
- Centre of Kostopil

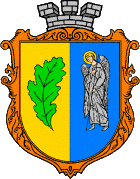
- Flag Coat of arms
- Interactive map of Kostopil
- Location of Kostopil Kostopil (Rivne Oblast)
- Coordinates: 50°53′0″N 26°27′0″E
- Country: Ukraine
- Oblast: Rivne Oblast
- Raion: Rivne Raion
- Hromada: Kostopil urban hromada
- First mentioned: 1783
- City rights: 1939

Government
  - Mayor: Yevheniy Denysyuk

Area
  - Total: 63.73 km^{2} (24.61 sq mi)

Population (2022)
  - Total: 30,838
- Time zone: UTC+2 (EET)
  - Summer (DST): UTC+3 (EEST)
- Postal code: 35000—35008
- Area code: +380 3657

Kostopil (Ukrainian: Костопіль [kosˈtɔpilʲ]; Polish: Kostopol) is a small city on the Zamchysko river in Rivne Oblast, western Ukraine, in the historical region of Volhynia. It was the administrative center of the Kostopil Raion up to 2020, but is now within the Rivne Raion. Population: 30,838 (2022 estimate).

== History ==
Kostopil was the property of Prince Władysław Dominik Zasławski and is mentioned in 1648-58 registers. It was originally a village based on a local iron mine, but in 1792 the local landowner, Leonard Wortzel, obtained town privileges for his estate including the right for an annual fair from Stanisław August Poniatowski, the last King of the Polish–Lithuanian Commonwealth. At this time Wortzel changed the town's name to Kostopol.

Following the Partitions of Poland under new policies of the Russian Empire many Germans migrated from occupied Polish lands to Volhynia because repossessed land by Russian military was available there for purchase. The region between Anielowka and Kostopol contained many German villages. Settlement in the town was encouraged by the imperial authorities but it stagnated until a railway station was opened on the Rovno — Vilna line in the late 1890s. The railway promoted the establishment of new industries such as flour mills, oil pressing, spinning mill, sawmill, and a match factory. Development was interrupted in 1906 when a fire destroyed most of the town's buildings. Afterwards, most new construction used bricks.

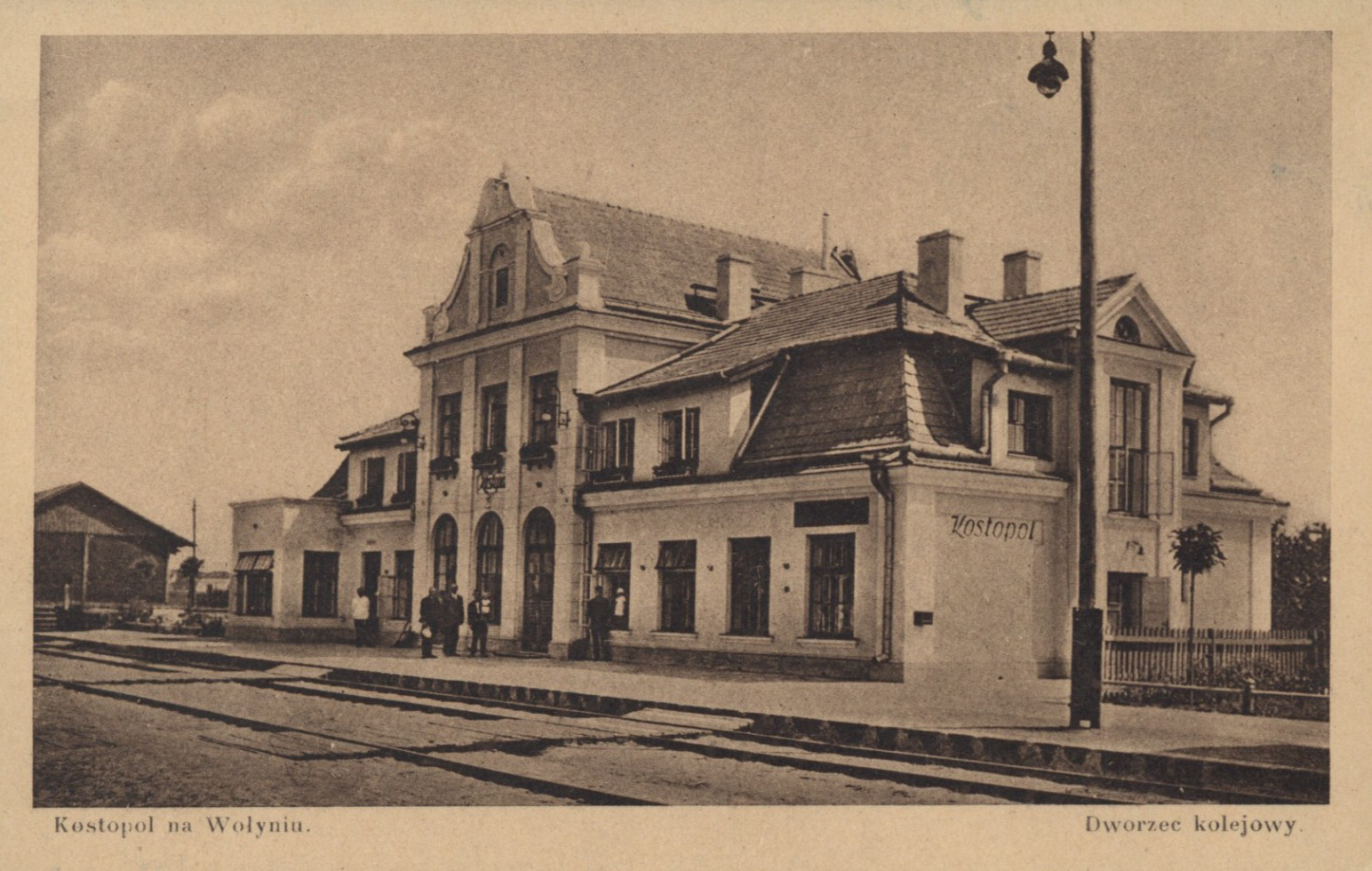
Railway station in the interwar period

The town had become a centre for Jewish settlement in the interwar Poland and this continued until World War II, when about 40% (about 4,000) of the population were Jewish. Kostopol became the local administrative centre of Kostopol County in 1925. The town had been joined with Poland after the end of First World War. By the end of the 1920s, there were three timber yards (two of them Jewish owned, one government owned), three plywood factories (Jewish owned), two furniture factories, two glass factories, two agriculture machinery works, three flour mills (two Jewish owned), two oil presses, four tar and turpentine factories and a brick factory operating in Kostopol. In nearby Janowa Dolina, there were granite and basalt quarries, with railway links to Kostopol station. The Polish government built a housing projects for the quarry workers.

A local newspaper has published in Kostopil since 1939.

=== World War II ===
On 19 September 1939 Red Army units captured Kostopil from Second Polish Republic, as a result of which the city was annexed into the Soviet Union as part of the Ukrainian SSR.

The Germans occupied Kostopol on 1 July 1941. A pogrom against the local Jews was then committed by local Ukrainians. The Germans progressively degraded the Jews' position and condition, by enforcing the wearing of yellow stars, imposing forced labour and confiscating Jewish property. On 16 August 1941, the Germans rounded up 470 of the most influential Jews in the community and transported them out of Kostopol, where they were all executed. Another 1,400 Jews related to those who had been executed, were arrested on 1 October and also taken away and killed.

A ghetto was established in Kostopol on 5 October 1941. Despite the great over-crowding, there were no epidemics. One hundred Jews, Judenrat members, Jewish Police and key professionals, were exempt and were allowed to live outside the ghetto. The ghetto was liquidated on 25 August 1942. German police surrounded the ghetto. The ghetto was emptied and the remaining inhabitants were transported to Khotinka, a nearby village, and exterminated upon arrival. A few managed to escape but they were caught and returned to the Germans and murdered. In July 1942 the remaining Jews from Rivne (perhaps 7,000 people) were brought by train to Kostopol and were murdered by German police in a quarry near woods outside the town.

On 24 August, in Kostopol's forced labour camp, 700 Jewish labourers, led by Gedalia Braier, revolted during the daily roll call (Appell). When Brajer shouted "Hura!", he started a mass escape attempt. Some reached the nearby forest, but most of them were caught and killed. Some survived with the help of local villagers and joined Soviet partisan units. Less than ten survived the war. Since March 1943, Kostopol was one of locations where Polish civilian population of Volhynia fled from the Ukrainian nationalists (see Volhynian Genocide). Here, the Polnisches Schutzmannschaftsbataillon 202 was stationed, protecting Polish population from attacks by the Ukrainian Insurgent Army.

Kostopol was captured by the Red Army on 31 January 1944. Only about 270 Kostopol Jews had survived, mostly those who had escaped eastwards in 1941.

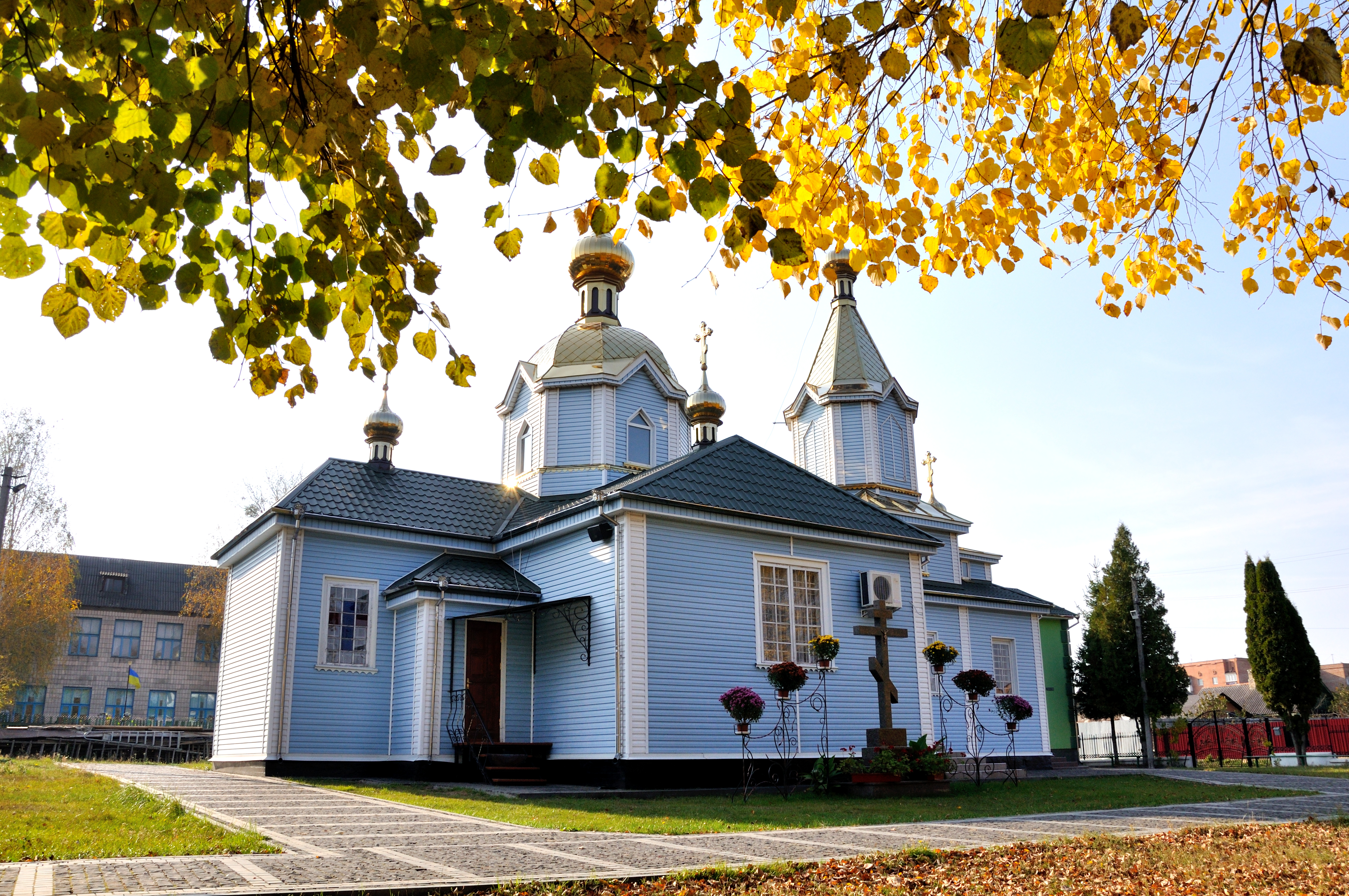
St. Alexander Nevsky Church

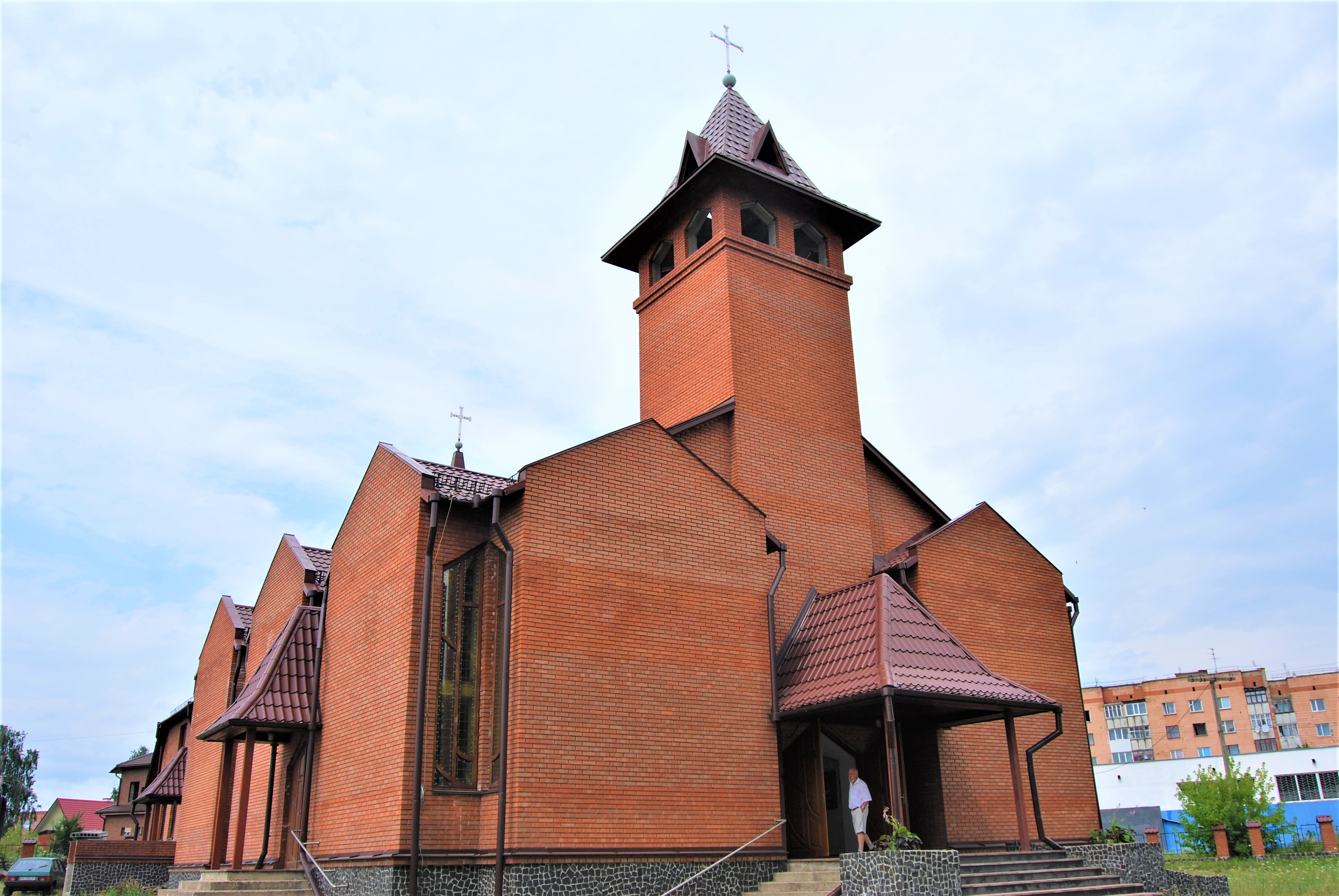
Catholic church

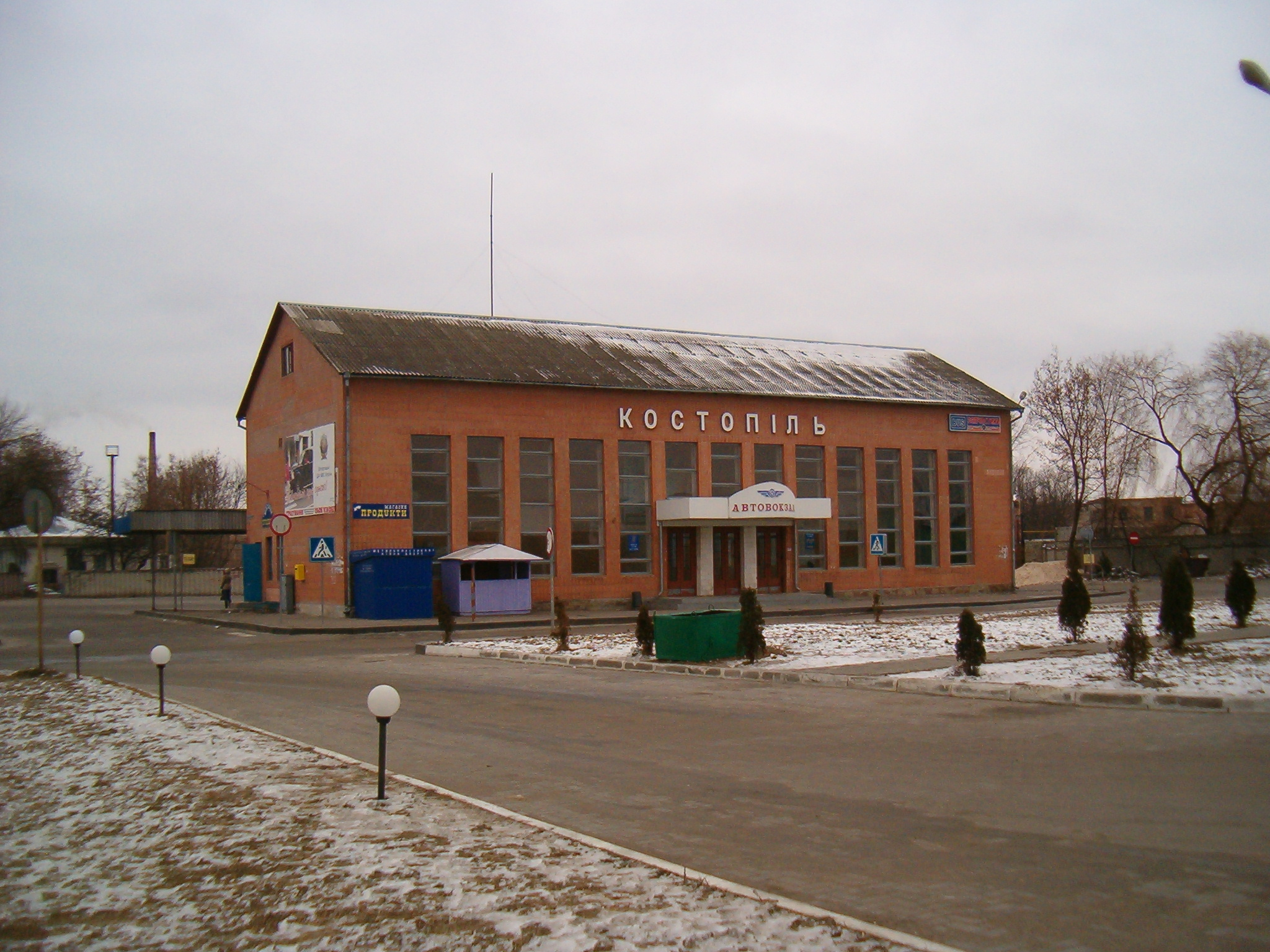
Kostopil bus station

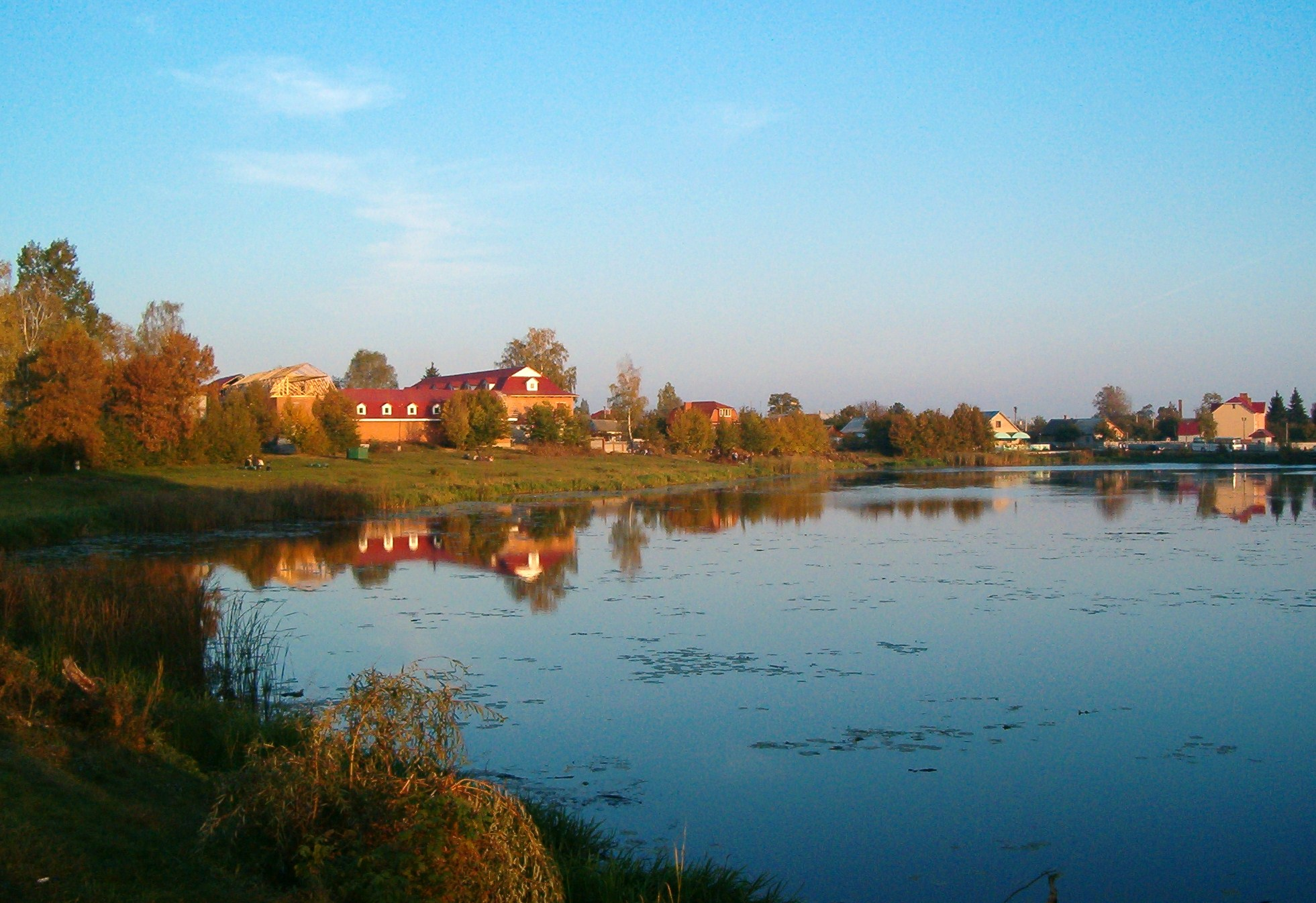
Zamchysko River in Kostopil

In 1952, a medical college was opened here.

In January 1989 the population was 31 610 people.

== Notable people ==
- Roman Datsiuk — Ukrainian football player.
- Serhiy Kozak — Ukrainian literary critic, publicist.
- Roman Piasyuk (1975—2015) — sergeant of the Armed Forces of Ukraine, participant of the Russian-Ukrainian war.
- Natalia Pogorilchuk — Ukrainian Geomorphologist, Candidate of Geographical Sciences, Associate Professor of Taras Shevchenko National University of Kyiv.
- Oleksander Reheza — member of Ukrainian political movement UPA.
- Ruslan Salivonchyk (1983–2014) — military officer of the Kherson special purpose police patrol volunteer battalion. He died in the battle near Ilovaysk.
- Vitaliy Stavsky (1991—2014) — junior sergeant of the 80th separate airmobile crew. He died on his birthday during an attack by militants at the Luhansk airport.
- Oleksandr Stiohanov — Ukrainian producer, songwriter, director, screenwriter, composer, and clip-maker.
- Yuriy Tkachuk (1968-2016) — Lieutenant Colonel of the Armed Forces of Ukraine, participant in the Russian-Ukrainian War.
