= Nowy Uścimów =

- Village
- Location within Poland
- Coordinates: 51°27′39″N 22°55′23″E
- Country: Poland
- Voivodeship: Lublin
- County: Lubartów
- Gmina: Uścimów

Nowy Uścimów [ˈnɔvɨ uɕˈt͡ɕimuf] is a village in the administrative district of Gmina Uścimów, within Lubartów County, Lublin Voivodeship, in eastern Poland.

In the years 1975–1998, the town administratively belonged to the then Lublin Province. To the northeast of the village is a lake called Uścimowiec. The village is a village council – with auxiliary units of the Uścimów commune.
