= Elżbietów, Lublin Voivodeship =

Elżbietów
- Village
- Location within Poland
- Coordinates: 51°30′37″N 22°21′22″E
- Country: Poland
- Voivodeship: Lublin
- County: Lubartów
- Gmina: Michów

Elżbietów [ɛlʐˈbjɛtuf] is a village in the administrative district of Gmina Michów, within Lubartów County, Lublin Voivodeship, in eastern Poland.
