= Bożniewice =

Bożniewice refers to the following places in Poland:

- Bożniewice, Lublin Voivodeship
- Bożniewice, West Pomeranian Voivodeship
