= Niedźwiada-Kolonia =

- Village
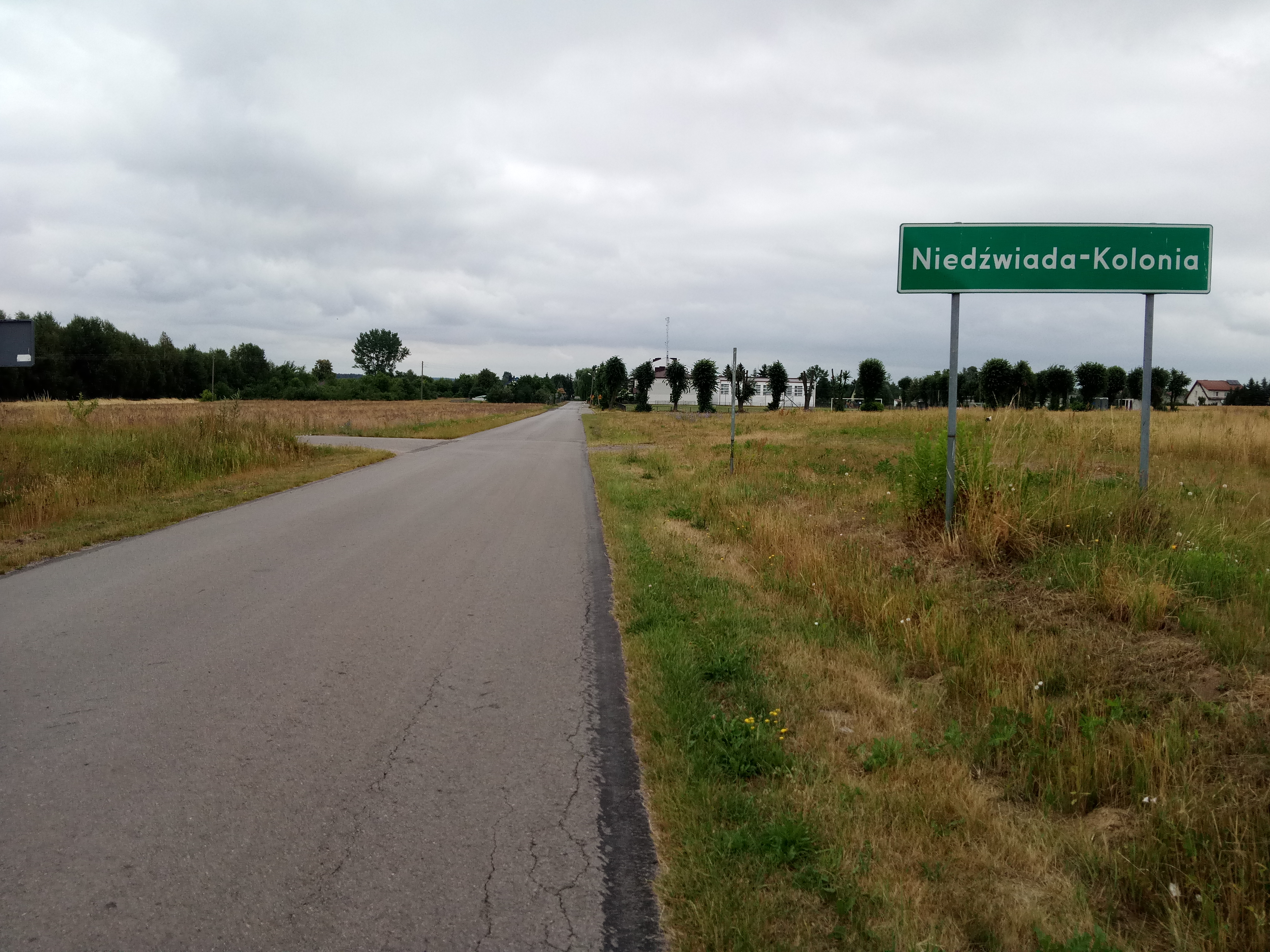

- Location within Poland
- Coordinates: 51°32′02″N 22°41′35″E
- Country: Poland
- Voivodeship: Lublin
- County: Lubartów
- Gmina: Niedźwiada
- Population: 437

Niedźwiada-Kolonia [ɲɛd͡ʑˈvjada kɔˈlɔɲa] is a village in the administrative district of Gmina Niedźwiada, within Lubartów County, Lublin Voivodeship, in eastern Poland.
