= Rudka Starościańska =

- Village
- Location within Poland
- Coordinates: 51°31′06″N 22°54′23″E
- Country: Poland
- Voivodeship: Lublin
- County: Lubartów
- Gmina: Uścimów
- Time zone: UTC+1 (CET)
  - Summer (DST): UTC+2 (CEST)

Rudka Starościańska [ˈrutka starɔɕˈt͡ɕaɲska] is a village in the administrative district of Gmina Uścimów, within Lubartów County, Lublin Voivodeship, in eastern Poland.

== History ==
Five Polish citizens were murdered by Nazi Germany in the village during World War II.
