= Talczyn-Kolonia =

- Village
- Location within Poland
- Coordinates: 51°40′59″N 22°23′30″E
- Country: Poland
- Voivodeship: Lublin
- County: Lubartów
- Gmina: Kock

Talczyn-Kolonia [ˈtalt͡ʂɨn kɔˈlɔɲa] is a village in the administrative district of Gmina Kock, within Lubartów County, Lublin Voivodeship, in eastern Poland.
