= Mejznerzyn =

- Village
- Location within Poland
- Coordinates: 51°34′N 22°18′E
- Country: Poland
- Voivodeship: Lublin
- County: Lubartów
- Gmina: Michów

Mejznerzyn [mɛi̯zˈnɛʐɨn] is a village in the administrative district of Gmina Michów, within Lubartów County, Lublin Voivodeship, in eastern Poland.
