= Poizdów-Kolonia =

- Village
- Location within Poland
- Coordinates: 51°38′12″N 22°20′46″E
- Country: Poland
- Voivodeship: Lublin
- County: Lubartów
- Gmina: Kock
- Time zone: UTC+1 (CET)
  - Summer (DST): UTC+2 (CEST)

Poizdów-Kolonia [pɔˈizduf kɔˈlɔɲa] is a village in the administrative district of Gmina Kock, within Lubartów County, Lublin Voivodeship, in eastern Poland.

== History ==
Nine Polish citizens were murdered by Nazi Germany in the village during World War II.
