= Brzeźnica Leśna =

- Village
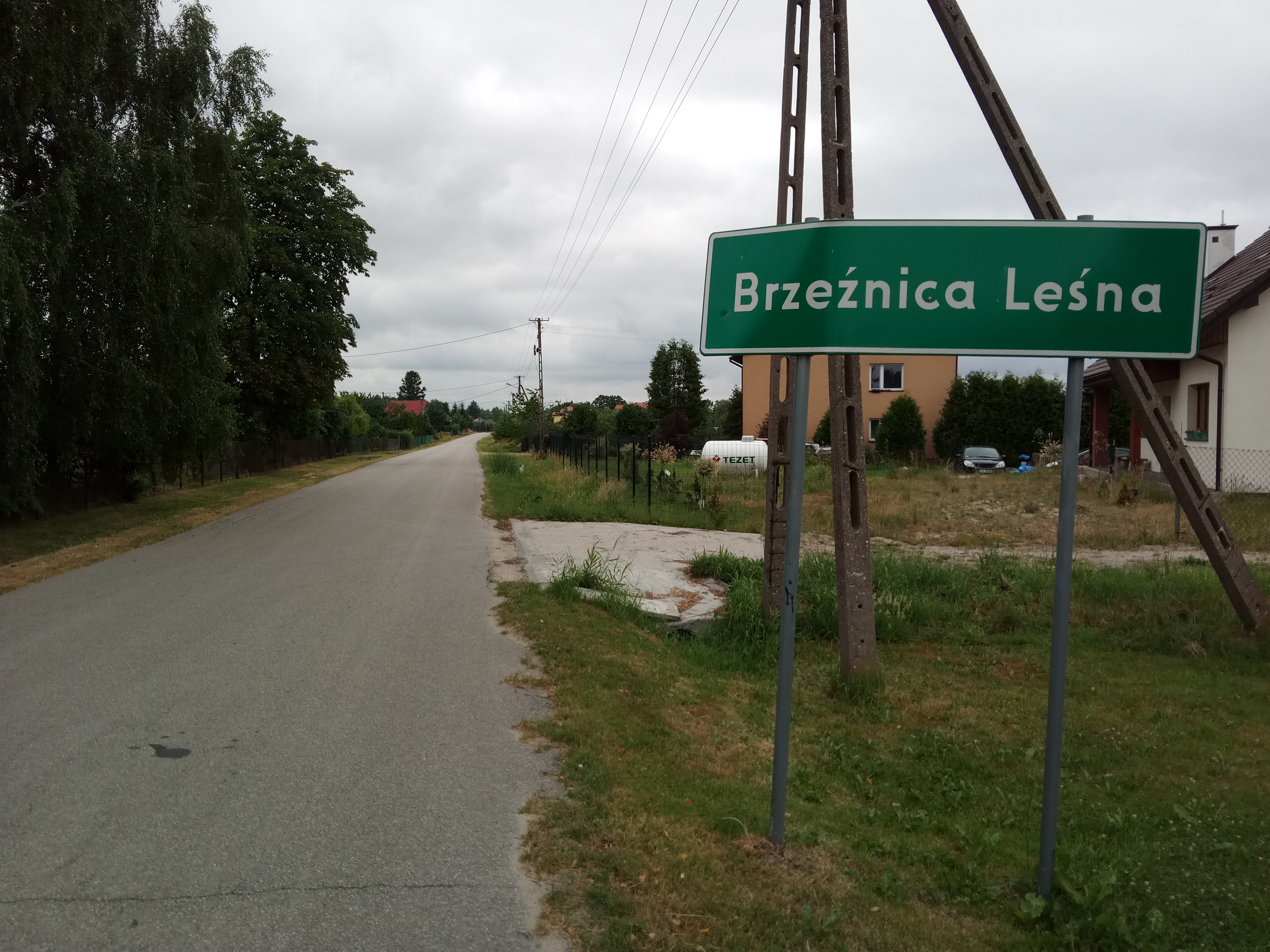

- Location within Poland
- Coordinates: 51°34′N 22°40′E
- Country: Poland
- Voivodeship: Lublin
- County: Lubartów
- Gmina: Niedźwiada

Brzeźnica Leśna [bʐɛʑˈnit͡sa ˈlɛɕna] is a village in the administrative district of Gmina Niedźwiada, within Lubartów County, Lublin Voivodeship, in eastern Poland.
