= Brzeźnica Bychawska-Kolonia =

- Village
- Location within Poland
- Coordinates: 51°31′43″N 22°44′0″E
- Country: Poland
- Voivodeship: Lublin
- County: Lubartów
- Gmina: Niedźwiada

Brzeźnica Bychawska-Kolonia [bʐɛʑˈnit͡sa bɨˈxafska kɔˈlɔɲa] is a village in the administrative district of Gmina Niedźwiada, within Lubartów County, Lublin Voivodeship, in eastern Poland.
