= Rudno, Lubartów County =

Rudno
- Village
- Location within Poland
- Coordinates: 51°31′46″N 22°21′56″E
- Country: Poland
- Voivodeship: Lublin
- County: Lubartów
- Gmina: Michów

Population
  - Total: 540
- Time zone: UTC+1 (CET)
  - Summer (DST): UTC+2 (CEST)

Rudno [ˈrudnɔ] is a village in the administrative district of Gmina Michów, within Lubartów County, Lublin Voivodeship, in eastern Poland.

== History ==
Three Polish citizens were murdered by Nazi Germany in the village during World War II.
