= Budki, Lubartów County =

Budki
- Village
- Location within Poland
- Coordinates: 51°32′21″N 22°15′5″E
- Country: Poland
- Voivodeship: Lublin
- County: Lubartów
- Gmina: Michów
- Population: 100

Budki [ˈbutki] is a village in the administrative district of Gmina Michów, within Lubartów County, Lublin Voivodeship, in eastern Poland.
