= Zakalew =

- Village
- Location within Poland
- Coordinates: 51°36′N 22°21′E
- Country: Poland
- Voivodeship: Lublin
- County: Lubartów
- Gmina: Kock
- Population: 81

Zakalew [zaˈkalɛf] is a village in the administrative district of Gmina Kock, within Lubartów County, Lublin Voivodeship, in eastern Poland.
