= Głębokie, Lubartów County =

Głębokie
- Village
- Location within Poland
- Coordinates: 51°29′N 22°56′E
- Country: Poland
- Voivodeship: Lublin
- County: Lubartów
- Gmina: Uścimów

Głębokie [ɡwɛmˈbɔkʲɛ] is a village in the administrative district of Gmina Uścimów, within Lubartów County, Lublin Voivodeship, in eastern Poland.
