= Białobrzegi-Kolonia =

- Village
- Location within Poland
- Coordinates: 51°38′20″N 22°22′46″E
- Country: Poland
- Voivodeship: Lublin
- County: Lubartów
- Gmina: Kock

Białobrzegi-Kolonia [bjawɔˈbʐɛɡi kɔˈlɔɲa] is a village in the administrative district of Gmina Kock, within Lubartów County, Lublin Voivodeship, in eastern Poland.
