= Gmina Uścimów =

Gmina Uścimów Uścimów Commune
- Gmina
- Flag Coat of arms

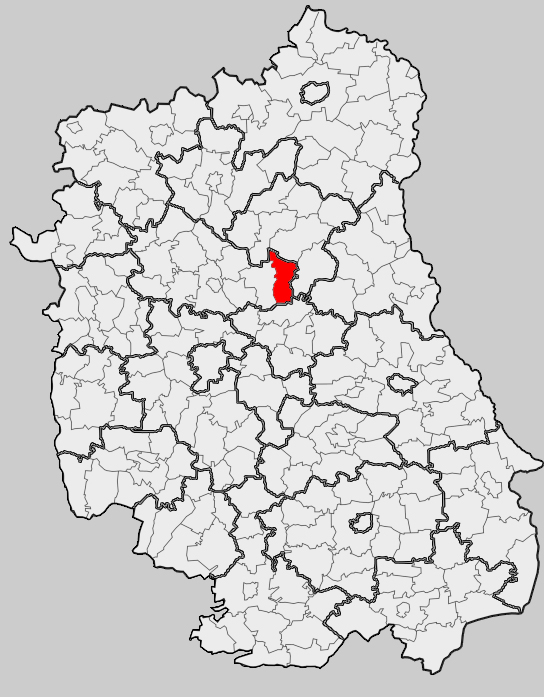
- Location within the county and voivodeship
- Coordinates (Uścimów): 51°28′N 22°56′E
- Country: Poland
- Voivodeship: Lublin
- County: Lubartów
- Seat: Uścimów

Area
  - Total: 108.61 km^{2} (41.93 sq mi)

Population (2015)
  - Total: 3,307
  - Density: 30.45/km^{2} (78.86/sq mi)
- Website: http://www.uscimow.lubelskie.pl

Gmina Uścimów is a rural gmina (administrative district) in Lubartów County, Lublin Voivodeship, in eastern Poland. Its seat is the village of Uścimów, which lies approximately 24 kilometres (15 mi) east of Lubartów and 36 km (22 mi) north-east of the regional capital Lublin.

The gmina covers an area of 108.61 square kilometres (41.9 sq mi), and as of 2006 its total population is 3,385 (3,307 in 2015).

The gmina contains part of the protected area called Łęczna Lake District Landscape Park.

== Villages ==
Gmina Uścimów contains the villages and settlements of Drozdówka, Głębokie, Krasne, Maśluchy, Nowa Jedlanka, Nowy Uścimów, Ochoża, Orzechów-Kolonia, Rudka Starościańska, Ryczka, Stara Jedlanka and Uścimów.

== Neighbouring gminas ==
Gmina Uścimów is bordered by the gminas of Dębowa Kłoda, Ludwin, Ostrów Lubelski, Parczew and Sosnowica.
