= Krupy, Lublin Voivodeship =

Krupy
- Village
- Location within Poland
- Coordinates: 51°35′N 22°21′E
- Country: Poland
- Voivodeship: Lublin
- County: Lubartów
- Gmina: Michów

Krupy [ˈkrupɨ] is a village in the administrative district of Gmina Michów, within Lubartów County, Lublin Voivodeship, in eastern Poland.
