= Tarło-Kolonia =

- Village
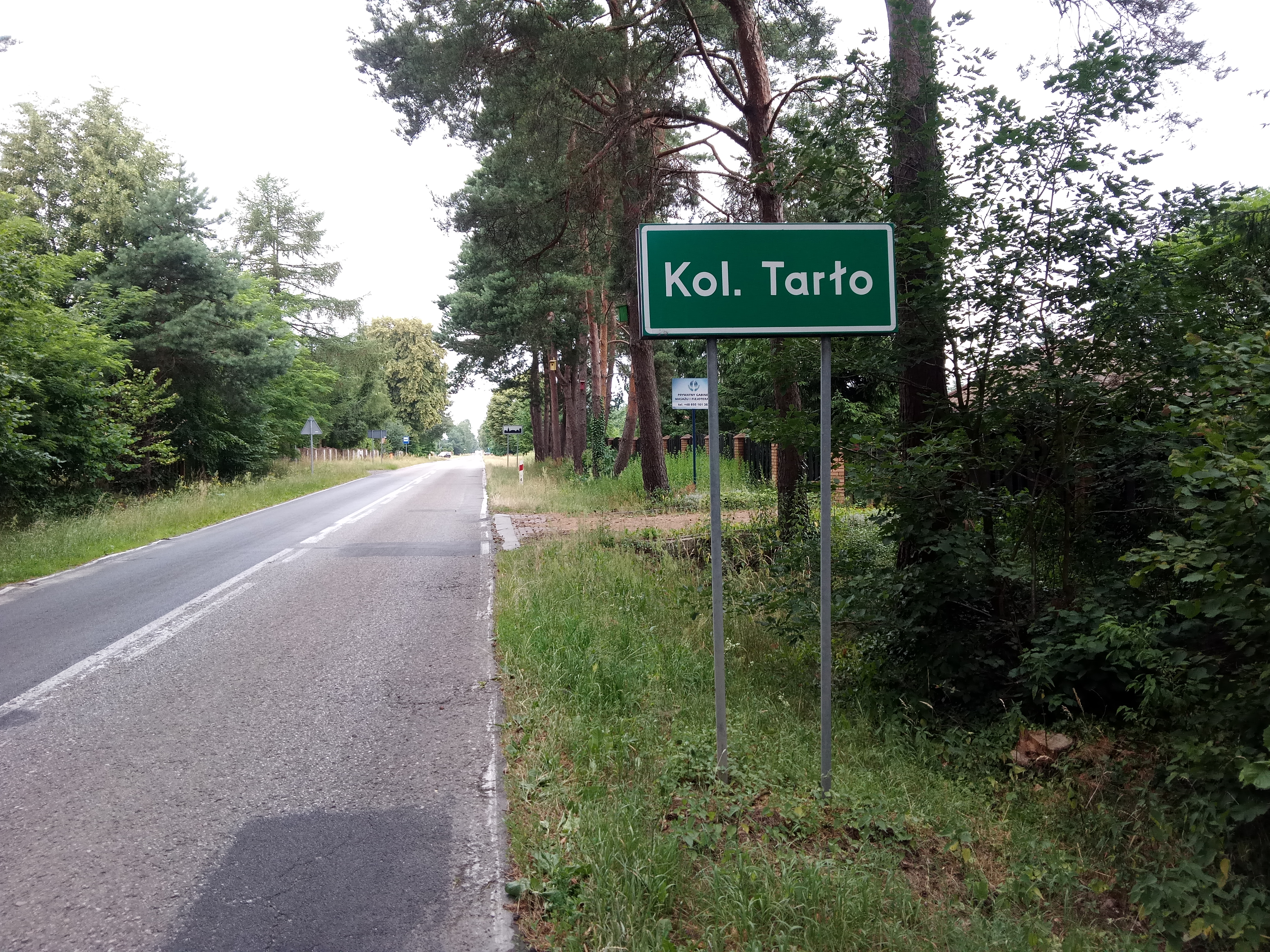

- Location within Poland
- Coordinates: 51°29′47″N 22°42′51″E
- Country: Poland
- Voivodeship: Lublin
- County: Lubartów
- Gmina: Niedźwiada

Tarło-Kolonia [ˈtarwɔ kɔˈlɔɲa] is a village in the administrative district of Gmina Niedźwiada, within Lubartów County, Lublin Voivodeship, in eastern Poland.
