= Tarło, Lublin Voivodeship =

Tarło
- Village
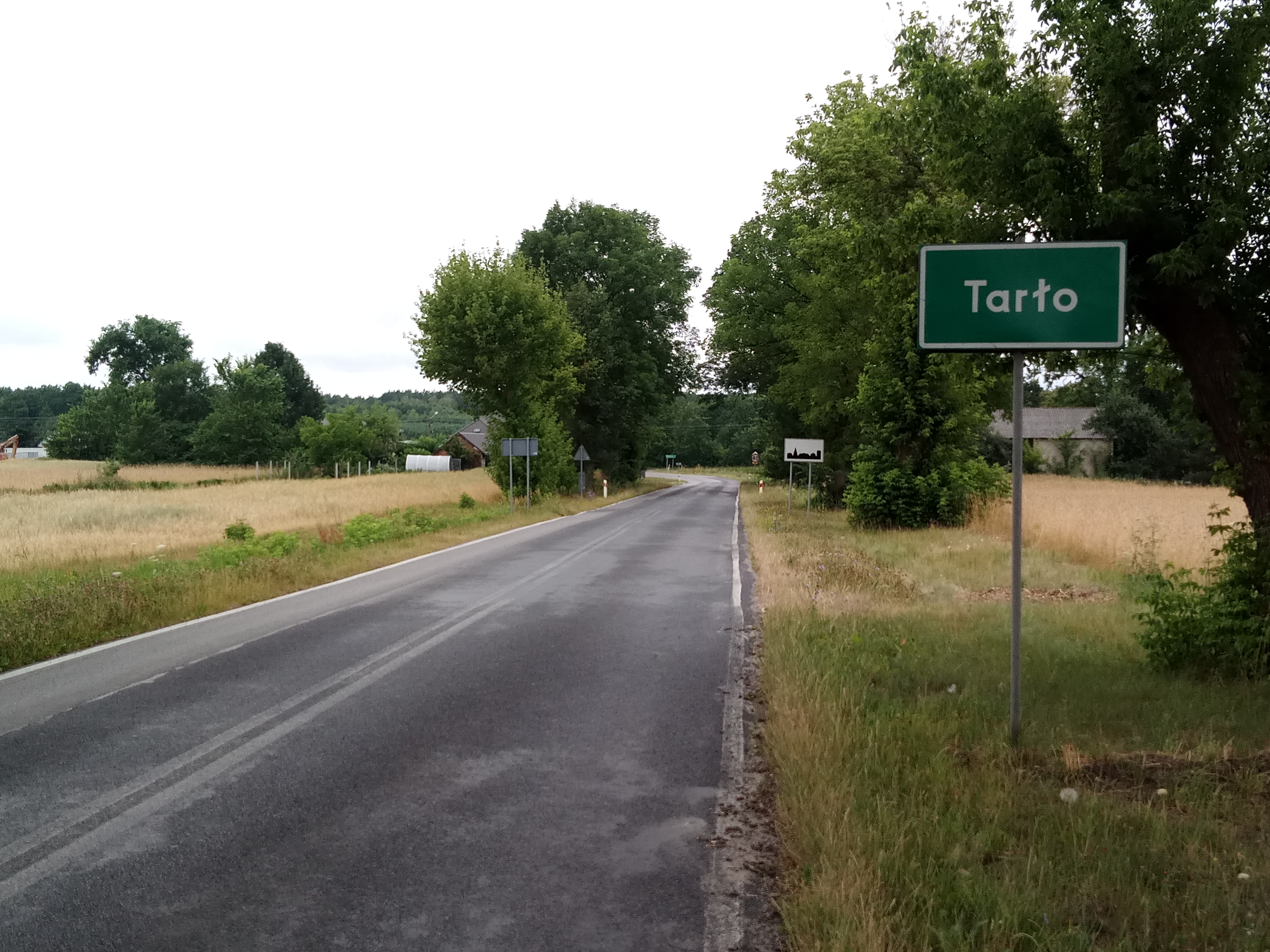

- Location within Poland
- Coordinates: 51°31′N 22°42′E
- Country: Poland
- Voivodeship: Lublin
- County: Lubartów
- Gmina: Niedźwiada
- Time zone: UTC+1 (CET)
  - Summer (DST): UTC+2 (CEST)

Tarło [ˈtarwɔ] is a village in the administrative district of Gmina Niedźwiada, within Lubartów County, Lublin Voivodeship, in eastern Poland.

== History ==
Six Polish citizens were murdered by Nazi Germany in the village during World War II.
