= Rawa, Lublin Voivodeship =

Rawa
- Village
- Location within Poland
- Coordinates: 51°33′N 22°23′E
- Country: Poland
- Voivodeship: Lublin
- County: Lubartów
- Gmina: Michów

Population
  - Total: 242
- Time zone: UTC+1 (CET)
  - Summer (DST): UTC+2 (CEST)

Rawa [ˈrava] is a village in the administrative district of Gmina Michów, within Lubartów County, Lublin Voivodeship, in eastern Poland.

== History ==
13 Polish citizens were murdered by Nazi Germany in the village during World War II.
