= Gmina Kock =

Gmina Kock Kock Commune
- Gmina
- Coat of arms

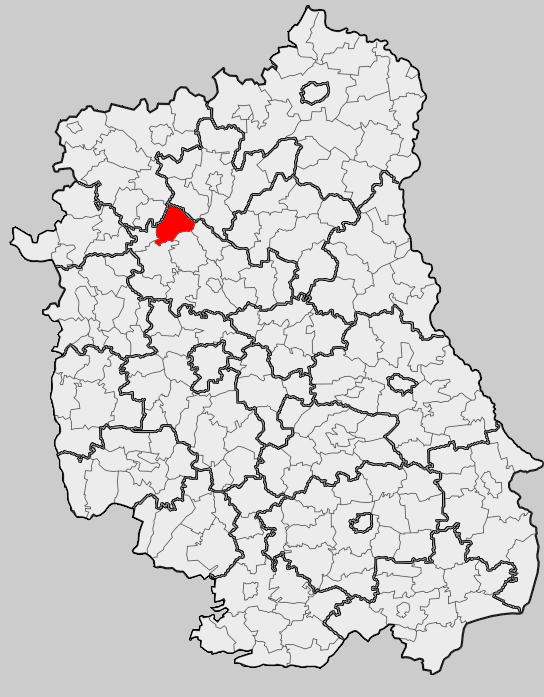
- Location within the county and voivodeship
- Coordinates (Kock): 51°39′N 22°27′E
- Country: Poland
- Voivodeship: Lublin
- County: Lubartów
- Seat: Kock

Area
  - Total: 100.62 km^{2} (38.85 sq mi)

Population (2015)
  - Total: 6,568
  - Density: 65.28/km^{2} (169.1/sq mi)
  - Urban: 3,372
  - Rural: 3,196
- Website: http://kock.pl/

Gmina Kock is an urban-rural gmina (administrative district) in Lubartów County, Lublin Voivodeship, in eastern Poland. Its seat is the town of Kock, which lies approximately 23 kilometres (14 mi) north-west of Lubartów and 46 km (29 mi) north of the regional capital Lublin.

The gmina covers an area of 100.62 square kilometres (38.8 sq mi), bordered by the Tyśmienica, Wieprz, and Czarna rivers. As of 2006 its total population is 6,763, out of which the population of Kock is 3,478 and the population of the rural part of the gmina is 3,285.

== Villages ==
Apart from the town of Kock, Gmina Kock contains the villages and settlements of Annopol, Annówka, Białobrzegi, Białobrzegi-Kolonia, Bożniewice, Górka, Lipniak, Poizdów, Poizdów-Kolonia, Ruska Wieś, Talczyn, Talczyn-Kolonia, Wygnanka and Zakalew.

== Neighbouring gminas ==
Gmina Kock is bordered by the gminas of Borki, Firlej, Jeziorzany, Michów, Ostrówek and Serokomla.
