= Rudzienko-Kolonia =

- Village
- Location within Poland
- Coordinates: 51°30′46″N 22°17′58″E
- Country: Poland
- Voivodeship: Lublin
- County: Lubartów
- Gmina: Michów

Rudzienko-Kolonia [ruˈd͡ʑɛŋkɔ kɔˈlɔɲa] is a village in the administrative district of Gmina Michów, within Lubartów County, Lublin Voivodeship, in eastern Poland.
