= Gmina Niedźwiada =

Gmina Niedźwiada Niedźwiada Commune
- Gmina
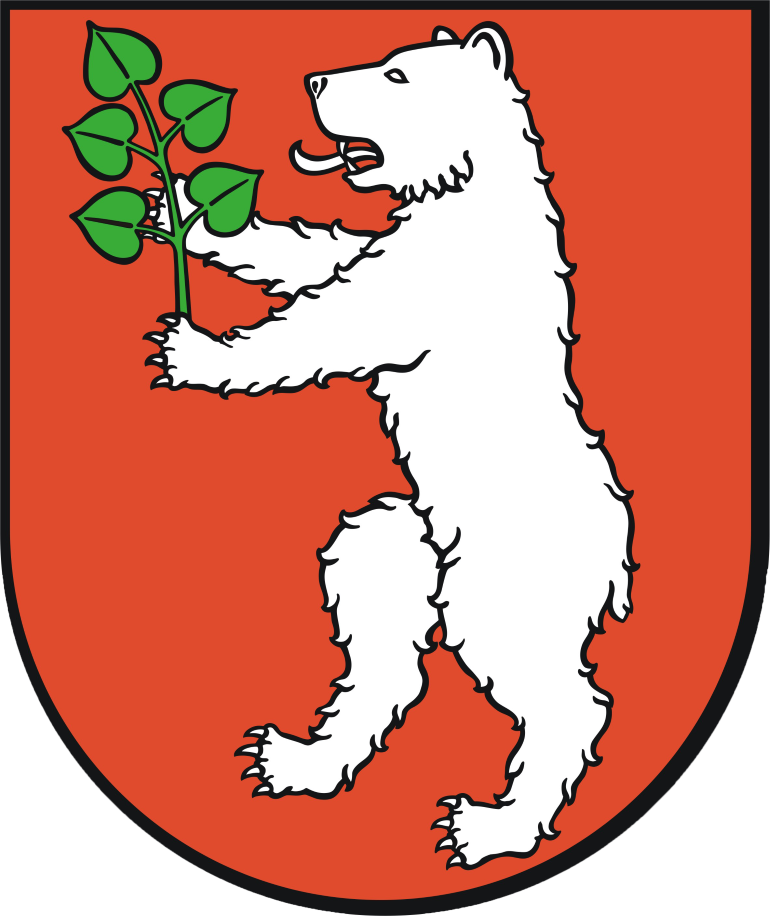
- Coat of arms

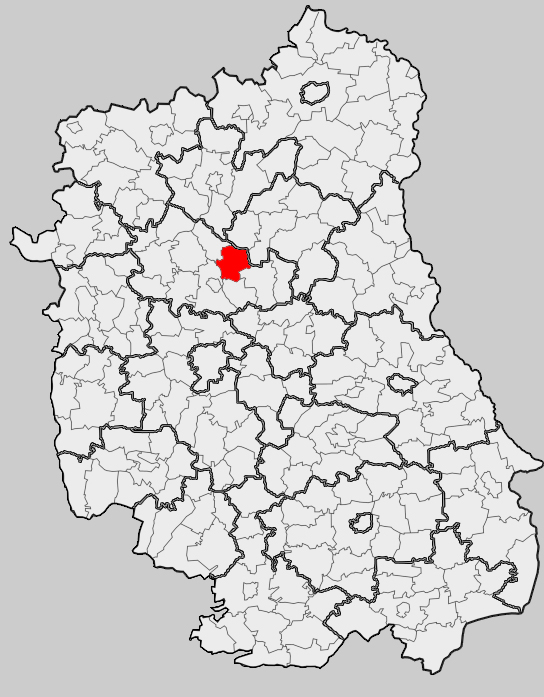
- Location within the county and voivodeship
- Coordinates (Niedźwiada): 51°32′13″N 22°41′24″E
- Country: Poland
- Voivodeship: Lublin
- County: Lubartów
- Seat: Niedźwiada

Area
  - Total: 95.82 km^{2} (37.00 sq mi)

Population (2015)
  - Total: 6,312
  - Density: 65.87/km^{2} (170.6/sq mi)
- Website: http://www.niedzwiada.lubelskie.pl

Gmina Niedźwiada is a rural gmina (administrative district) in Lubartów County, Lublin Voivodeship, in eastern Poland. Its seat is the village of Niedźwiada, which lies approximately 10 kilometres (6 mi) north-east of Lubartów and 34 km (21 mi) north of the regional capital Lublin.

The gmina covers an area of 95.82 square kilometres (37.0 sq mi), and as of 2006 its total population is 6,334 (6,312 in 2015).

== Villages ==
Gmina Niedźwiada contains the villages and settlements of Berejów, Brzeźnica Bychawska, Brzeźnica Bychawska-Kolonia, Brzeźnica Książęca, Brzeźnica Książęca-Kolonia, Brzeźnica Leśna, Górka Lubartowska, Klementynów, Niedźwiada, Niedźwiada-Kolonia, Pałecznica, Pałecznica-Kolonia, Tarło, Tarło-Kolonia, Zabiele and Zabiele-Kolonia.

== Neighbouring gminas ==
Gmina Niedźwiada is bordered by the town of Lubartów and by the gminas of Lubartów, Ostrów Lubelski, Ostrówek, Parczew, Serniki and Siemień.
