= Giżyce, Lublin Voivodeship =

Giżyce
- Village
- Location within Poland
- Coordinates: 51°36′N 22°23′E
- Country: Poland
- Voivodeship: Lublin
- County: Lubartów
- Gmina: Michów
- Time zone: UTC+1 (CET)
  - Summer (DST): UTC+2 (CEST)

Giżyce [ɡiˈʐɨt͡sɛ] is a village in the administrative district of Gmina Michów, within Lubartów County, Lublin Voivodeship, in eastern Poland.

== History ==
Seven Polish citizens were murdered by Nazi Germany in the village during World War II.
