= Uścimów =

Stary Uścimów
- Village
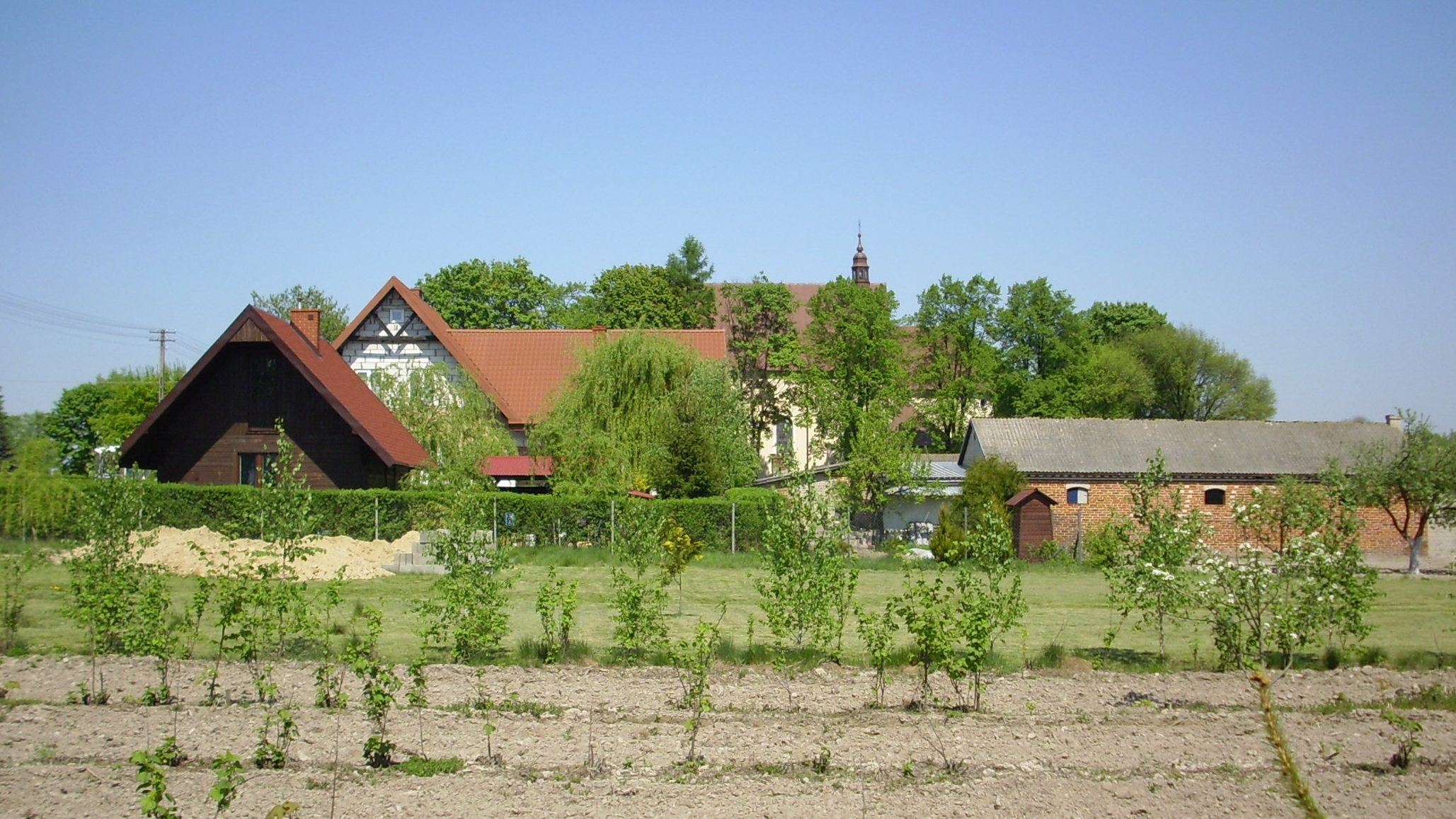

- Location within Poland
- Coordinates: 51°28′N 22°56′E
- Country: Poland
- Voivodeship: Lublin
- County: Lubartów
- Gmina: Uścimów
- Time zone: UTC+1 (CET)
  - Summer (DST): UTC+2 (CEST)

Stary Uścimów [uɕˈt͡ɕimuf] is a village in Lubartów County, Lublin Voivodeship, in eastern Poland. It is the seat of the gmina (administrative district) called Gmina Uścimów.

== History ==
Three Polish citizens were murdered by Nazi Germany in the village during World War II.
