= Lipniak, Gmina Kock =

Lipniak
- Village
- Location within Poland
- Coordinates: 51°39′49″N 22°30′39″E
- Country: Poland
- Voivodeship: Lublin
- County: Lubartów
- Gmina: Kock

Lipniak [ˈlipɲak] is a village in the administrative district of Gmina Kock, within Lubartów County, Lublin Voivodeship, in eastern Poland.
