= Przytoczno =

Village in Lublin Voivodeship, Poland

- Village
- Location within Poland
- Coordinates: 51°37′N 22°16′E
- Country: Poland
- Voivodeship: Lublin
- County: Lubartów
- Gmina: Jeziorzany
- Elevation: 137 m (449 ft)

Population (2011)
  - Total: 1,021
- Time zone: UTC+1 (CET)
  - Summer (DST): UTC+2 (CEST)
- Postal code: 21-146
- Area code: +48 81
- Vehicle registration: LLB

Przytoczno (Polish: [pʂɨˈtɔt͡ʂnɔ]) is a village in the administrative district of Gmina Jeziorzany, within Lubartów County, Lublin Voivodeship, in eastern Poland.

Ancient Roman coins – denarii of emperors Domitian and Antoninus Pius – have been found in Przytoczno.
