= Niedźwiada, Lubartów County =

Niedźwiada
- Village
- Location within Poland
- Coordinates: 51°32′13″N 22°41′24″E
- Country: Poland
- Voivodeship: Lublin
- County: Lubartów
- Gmina: Niedźwiada

Niedźwiada [ɲɛd͡ʑˈvjada] is a village in Lubartów County, Lublin Voivodeship, in eastern Poland. It is the seat of the gmina (administrative district) called Gmina Niedźwiada.

In 2001 there was a proposal to build an airport near the village to serve the city of Lublin, and a company was formed 2004 with involvement from local and regional government, but in 2007 a location on the outskirts of Świdnik, east of Lublin, was chosen as the site for Lublin Airport, which opened in 2012.
