= Lipniak, Gmina Michów =

Lipniak
- Village
- Location within Poland
- Coordinates: 51°34′20″N 22°21′19″E
- Country: Poland
- Voivodeship: Lublin
- County: Lubartów
- Gmina: Michów
- Population: 60

Lipniak [ˈlipɲak] is a village in the administrative district of Gmina Michów, within Lubartów County, Lublin Voivodeship, in eastern Poland.
