= Anielówka =

- Village
- Location within Poland
- Coordinates: 51°34′15″N 22°17′22″E
- Country: Poland
- Voivodeship: Lublin
- County: Lubartów
- Gmina: Michów

Anielówka [aɲɛˈlufka] is a village in the administrative district of Gmina Michów, within Lubartów County, Lublin Voivodeship, in eastern Poland.
