= Gmina Michów =

Gmina Michów Michów Commune
- Gmina
- Coat of arms

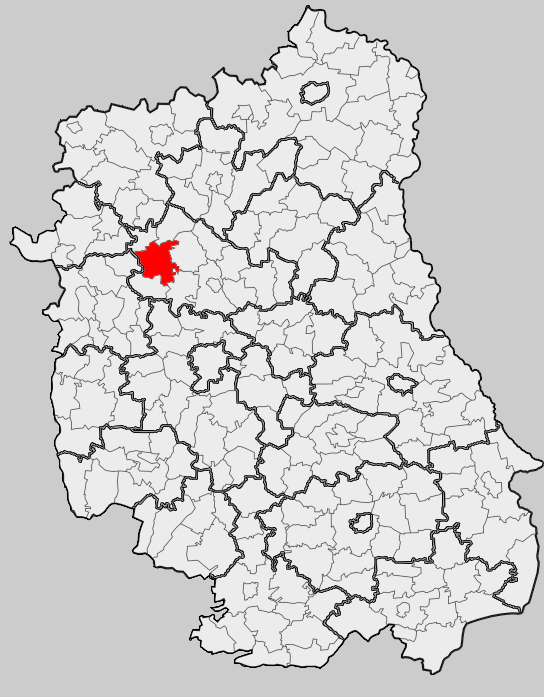
- Location within the county and voivodeship
- Coordinates (Michów): 51°31′32″N 22°18′49″E
- Country: Poland
- Voivodeship: Lublin
- County: Lubartów
- Seat: Michów

Area
  - Total: 135.93 km^{2} (52.48 sq mi)

Population (2015)
  - Total: 6,059
  - Density: 44.57/km^{2} (115.4/sq mi)
- Website: http://www.michow.lubelskie.pl

Gmina Michów is a rural gmina (administrative district) in Lubartów County, Lublin Voivodeship, in eastern Poland. Its seat is the village of Michów, which lies approximately 21 kilometres (13 mi) west of Lubartów and 36 km (22 mi) north-west of the regional capital Lublin.

The gmina covers an area of 135.93 square kilometres (52.5 sq mi), and as of 2006 its total population is 6,417 (6,059 in 2015).

== Villages ==
Gmina Michów contains the villages and settlements of Aleksandrówka, Anielówka, Budki, Chudowola, Elżbietów, Gawłówka, Giżyce, Gołąb, Gołąb-Kolonia, Katarzyn, Kolonia Giżyce, Krupy, Kruszyna, Lipniak, Mejznerzyn, Meszno, Miastkówek, Michów, Młyniska, Natalin, Ostrów, Podlodówek, Rawa, Rudno, Rudzienko, Rudzienko-Kolonia, Trzciniec, Węgielce, Wólka Michowska, Wypnicha and Zofianówka.

== Neighbouring gminas ==
Gmina Michów is bordered by the gminas of Abramów, Baranów, Firlej, Jeziorzany, Kamionka and Kock.
