= Gmina Serniki =

Gmina Serniki Serniki Commune
- Gmina
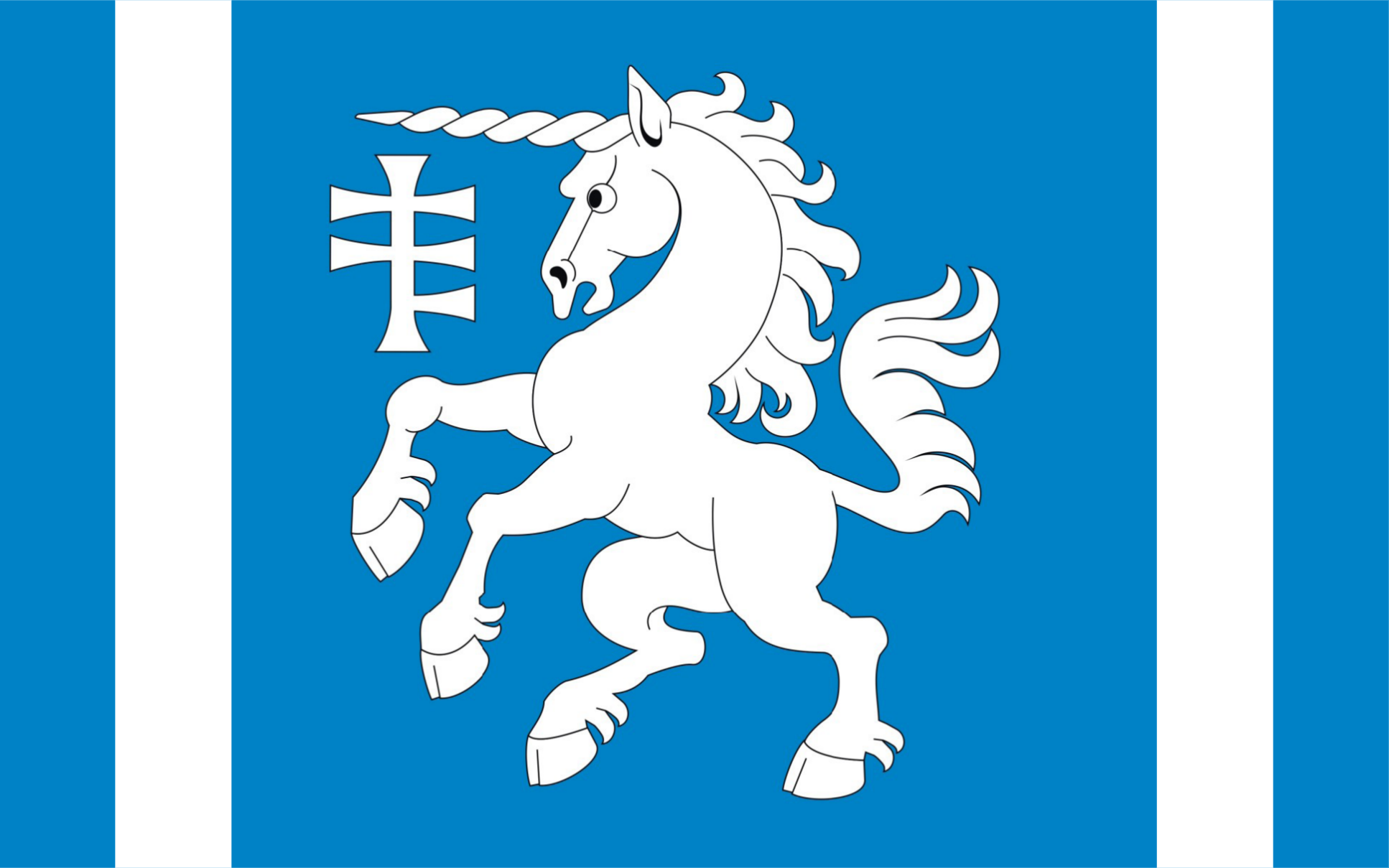
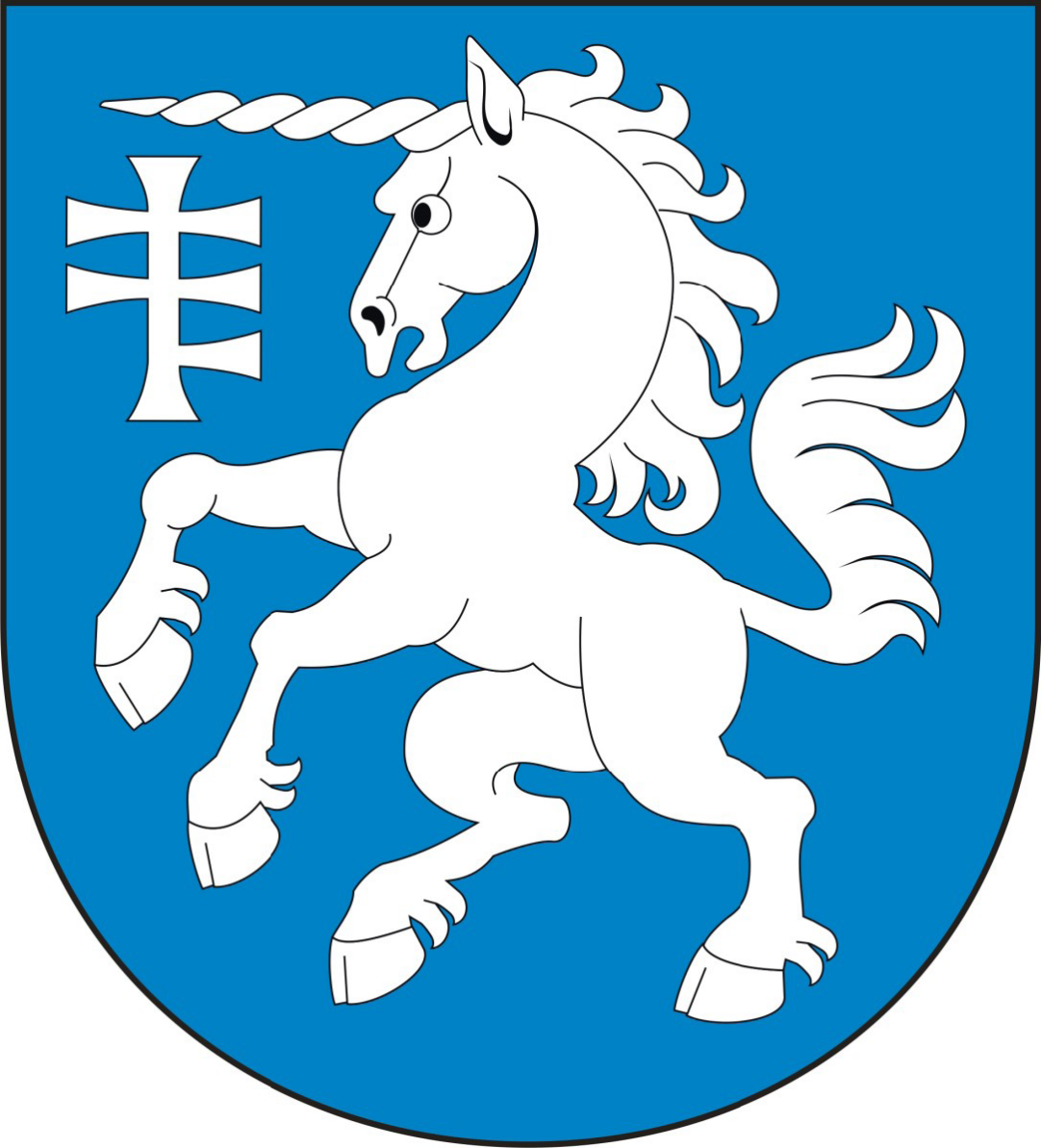
- Flag Coat of arms

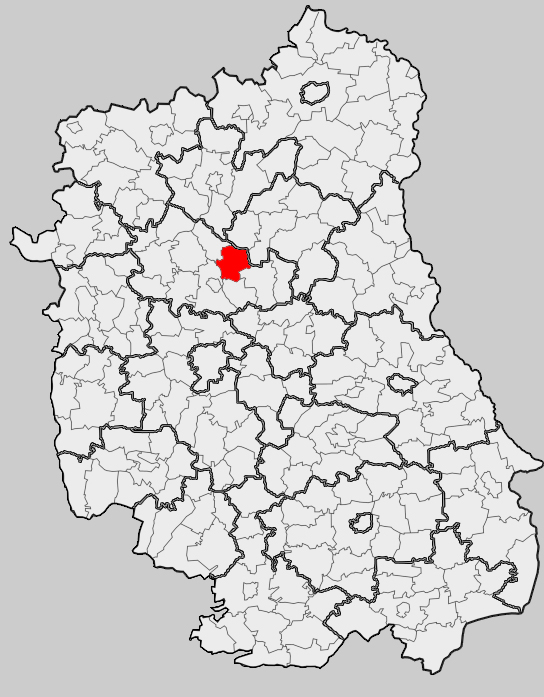
- Location within the county and voivodeship
- Coordinates (Serniki): 51°26′N 22°40′E
- Country: Poland
- Voivodeship: Lublin
- County: Lubartów
- Seat: Serniki

Area
  - Total: 75.43 km^{2} (29.12 sq mi)

Population (2015)
  - Total: 4,906
  - Density: 65.04/km^{2} (168.5/sq mi)
- Website: http://www.serniki.lubelskie.pl

Gmina Serniki is a rural gmina (administrative district) in Lubartów County, Lublin Voivodeship, in eastern Poland. Its seat is the village of Serniki, which lies approximately 6 kilometres (4 mi) south-east of Lubartów and 22 km (14 mi) north of the regional capital Lublin.

The gmina covers an area of 75.43 square kilometres (29.1 sq mi), and as of 2006 its total population is 4,833 (4,906 in 2015).

== Villages ==
Gmina Serniki contains the villages and settlements of Brzostówka, Czerniejów, Nowa Wieś, Nowa Wola, Serniki, Serniki-Kolonia, Wola Sernicka, Wola Sernicka-Kolonia, Wólka Zabłocka and Wólka Zawieprzycka.

== Neighbouring gminas ==
Gmina Serniki is bordered by the gminas of Lubartów, Niedźwiada, Ostrów Lubelski and Spiczyn.
