= Serniki =

- Village
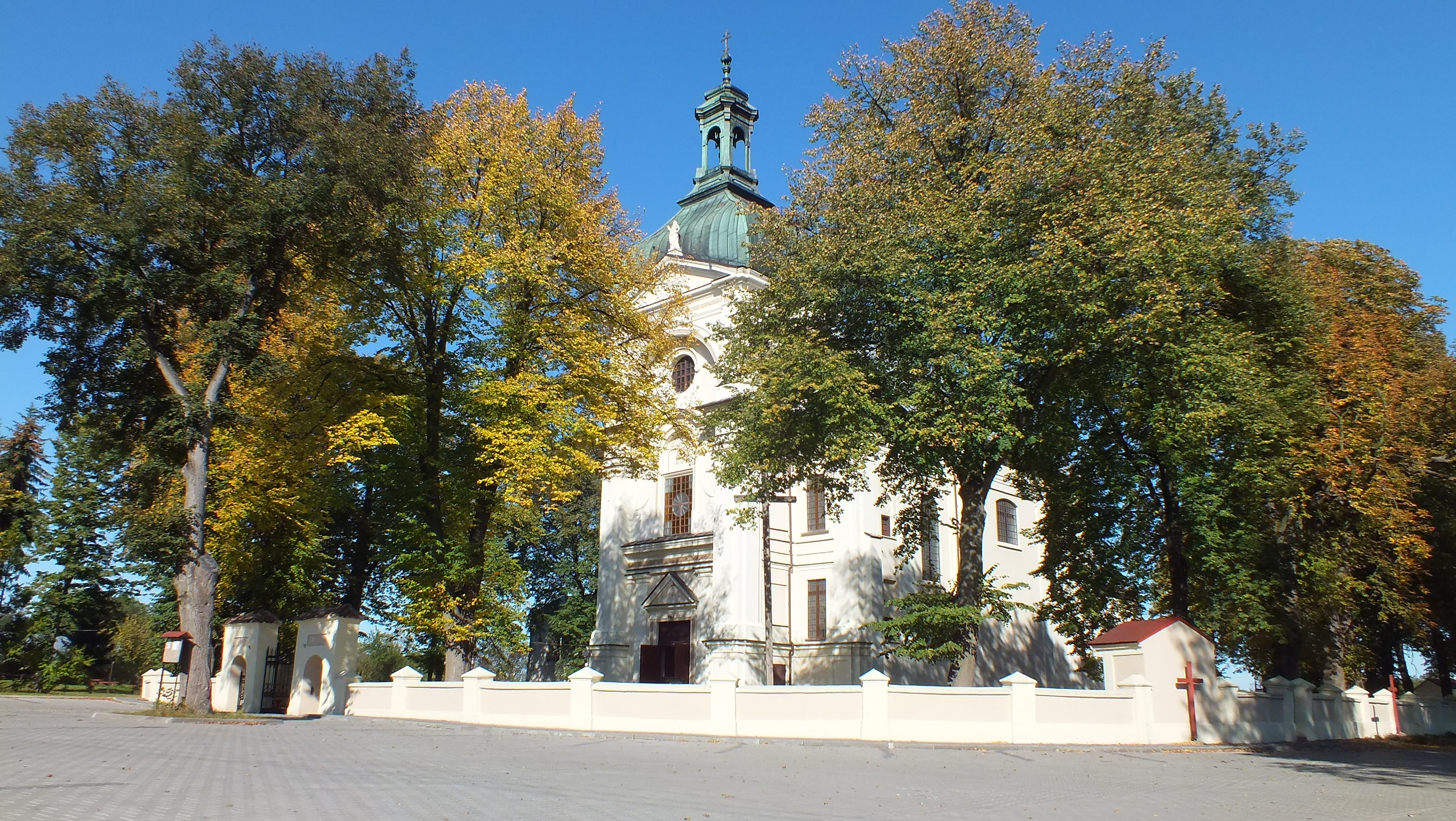
- Church of Saint Mary Magdalene

- Location within Poland
- Coordinates: 51°26′N 22°40′E
- Country: Poland
- Voivodeship: Lublin
- County: Lubartów
- Gmina: Serniki

Serniki [sɛrˈniki] is a village in Lubartów County, Lublin Voivodeship, in eastern Poland. It is the seat of the gmina (administrative district) called Gmina Serniki.
