= Gmina Jeziorzany =

Gmina Jeziorzany Jeziorzany Commune
- Gmina
- Coat of arms

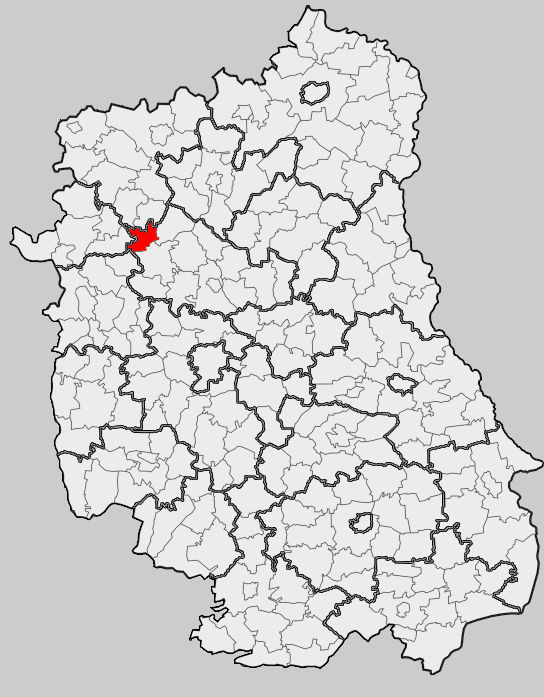
- Location within the county and voivodeship
- Coordinates (Jeziorzany): 51°36′8″N 22°16′37″E
- Country: Poland
- Voivodeship: Lublin
- County: Lubartów
- Seat: Jeziorzany

Area
  - Total: 66.63 km^{2} (25.73 sq mi)

Population (2015)
  - Total: 2,856
  - Density: 42.86/km^{2} (111.0/sq mi)
- Website: https://jeziorzany.eu/

Gmina Jeziorzany is a rural gmina (administrative district) in Lubartów County, Lublin Voivodeship, in eastern Poland. Its seat is the village of Jeziorzany, which lies approximately 27 kilometres (17 mi) north-west of Lubartów and 45 km (28 mi) north-west of the regional capital Lublin.

The gmina covers an area of 66.63 square kilometres (25.7 sq mi), and as of 2006 its total population is 2,896 (2,856 in 2015).

== Villages ==
Gmina Jeziorzany contains the villages and settlements of Blizocin, Drewnik, Jeziorzany, Krępa, Przytoczno, Skarbiciesz, Stawik, Stoczek Kocki, Walentynów and Wola Blizocka.

== Neighbouring gminas ==
Gmina Jeziorzany is bordered by the gminas of Adamów, Baranów, Kock, Michów, Serokomla and Ułęż.
