= Michów, Lublin Voivodeship =

Michów
- Village
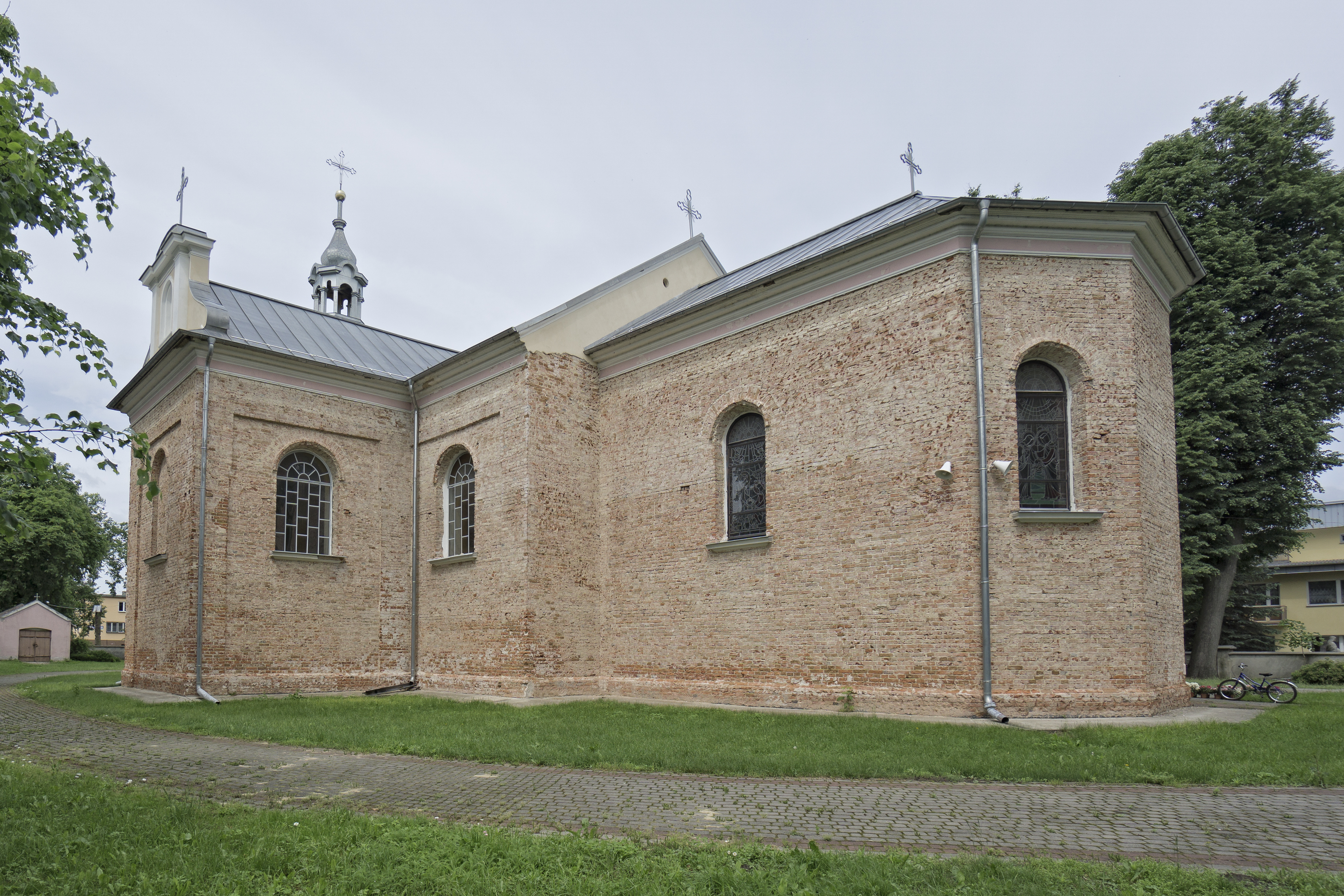
- Church of the Assumption of the Virgin Mary

- Location within Poland
- Coordinates: 51°31′32″N 22°18′49″E
- Country: Poland
- Voivodeship: Lublin
- County: Lubartów
- Gmina: Michów

Population
  - Total: 1,746
- Website: http://www.michow.lubelskie.pl/index.php

Michów [ˈmixuf] is a village in Lubartów County, Lublin Voivodeship, in eastern Poland. It is the seat of the gmina (administrative district) called Gmina Michów.

== World War II ==
Soon after the Nazi invasion of the town in 1939, more than 1,700 Michów Jews and another 700 dwellers of Łysoboki were taken to the ghetto in Łuków nearby. On June 6, 1942, this group was dispatched to Opole Lubelskie, from which they were most probably deported to the death camp in Sobibór in May 1942. Another group of Jews from Michów were loaded on wagons and taken to the railway station in Klementowice, from which they were sent to both Sobibór and Majdanek in May 1942. The 2,000 Jews of Michów ceased to exist and the Jewish community was never reconstituted.
