= Lipniak, Lublin County =

Village in Lublin Voivodeship, Poland

Lipniak
- Village
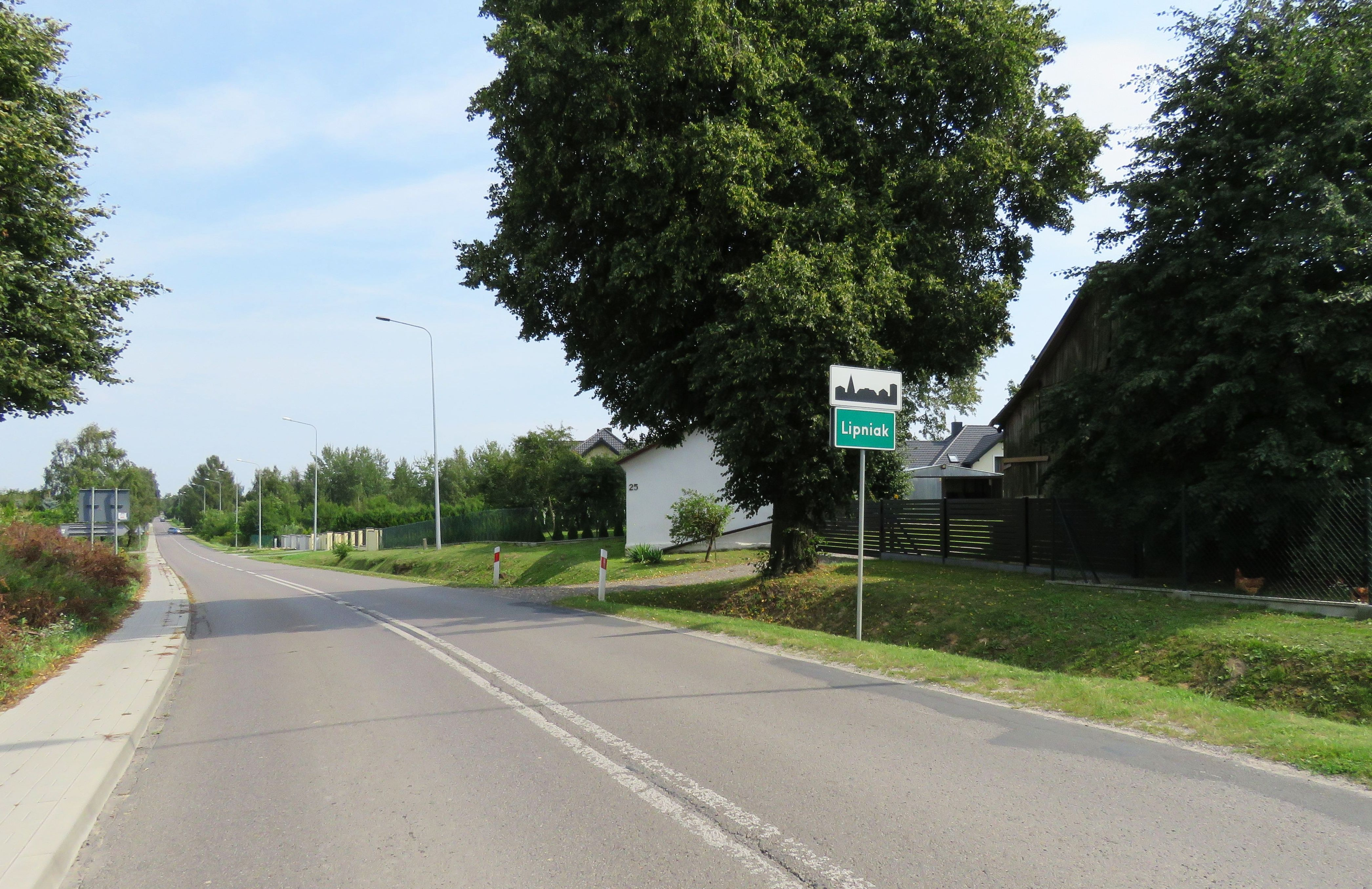
- Street of Lipniak, Lublin County

- Location within Poland
- Coordinates: 51°14′35″N 22°27′13″E
- Country: Poland
- Voivodeship: Lublin
- County: Lublin
- Gmina: Konopnica

Lipniak [ˈlipɲak] is a village in the administrative district of Gmina Konopnica, within Lublin County, Lublin Voivodeship, in eastern Poland.
