= Lubartów County =

Lubartów County Powiat lubartowski
- County
- Flag Coat of arms

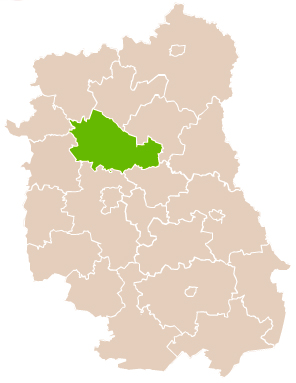
- Location within the voivodeship
- Coordinates (Lubartów): 51°28′N 22°36′E
- Country: Poland
- Voivodeship: Lublin
- Seat: Lubartów
- Gminas: Total 13 (incl. 1 urban): Lubartów; Gmina Abramów; Gmina Firlej; Gmina Jeziorzany; Gmina Kamionka; Gmina Kock; Gmina Lubartów; Gmina Michów; Gmina Niedźwiada; Gmina Ostrów Lubelski; Gmina Ostrówek; Gmina Serniki; Gmina Uścimów

Area
  - Total: 1,290.35 km^{2} (498.21 sq mi)

Population (2019)
  - Total: 88,591
  - Density: 68.657/km^{2} (177.82/sq mi)
  - Urban: 27,319
  - Rural: 61,272
- Car plates: LLB
- Website: www.powiatlubartowski.pl

Lubartów County (Polish: powiat lubartowski) is a unit of territorial administration and local government (powiat) in Lublin Voivodeship, eastern Poland. It was established on January 1, 1999, as a result of the Polish local government reforms passed in 1998. Its administrative seat and largest town is Lubartów, which lies 25 kilometres (16 mi) north of the regional capital Lublin. The county also contains the towns of Kock, lying 23 km (14 mi) north-west of Lubartów, and Ostrów Lubelski, 18 km (11 mi) east of Lubartów.

The county covers an area of 1,290.35 square kilometres (498.2 sq mi). As of 2019, its total population is 88,591, out of which the population of Lubartów is 21,948, that of Kock is 3,293, that of Ostrów Lubelski is 2,078, and the rural population is 61,272.

== Neighbouring counties ==
Lubartów County is bordered by Łuków County and Radzyń County to the north, Parczew County to the north-east, Łęczna County to the south-east, Lublin County to the south, and Puławy County and Ryki County to the west.

== Administrative divisions ==
The county is subdivided into 13 gminas (one urban, two urban-rural and 10 rural). These are listed in the following table, in descending order of population.

Gmina	Type	Area (km^{2})	Population (2019)	Seat
Lubartów	urban	13.9	21,948	
Gmina Lubartów	rural	158.9	11,745	Lubartów (Note: seat not part of the gmina)
Gmina Kamionka	rural	111.9	6,481	Kamionka
Gmina Kock	urban-rural	100.6	6,400	Kock
Gmina Niedźwiada	rural	95.8	6,198	Niedźwiada
Gmina Firlej	rural	126.4	5,909	Firlej
Gmina Michów	rural	135.9	5,865	Michów
Gmina Ostrów Lubelski	urban-rural	121.7	5,214	Ostrów Lubelski
Gmina Serniki	rural	75.4	4,934	Serniki
Gmina Abramów	rural	84.5	4,051	Abramów
Gmina Ostrówek	rural	90.0	3,874	Ostrówek
Gmina Uścimów	rural	108.6	3,165	Uścimów
Gmina Jeziorzany	rural	66.6	2,807	Jeziorzany
