= Józef Berkowicz =

Polish military officer (1789–1846)

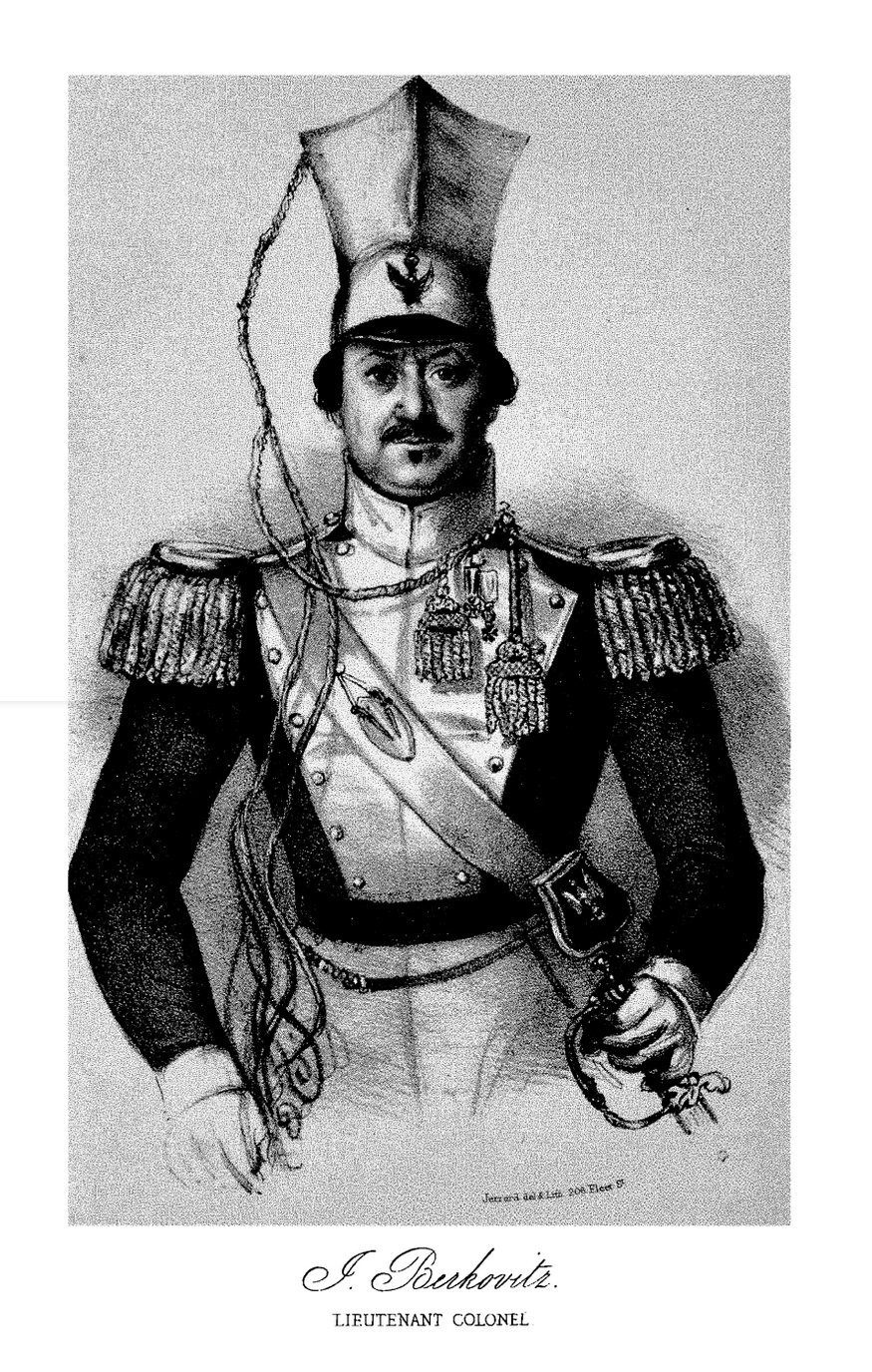
- Nicknames: Joseph Berkovitz; Joseph Berkowitz
- Born: 1789; Praga, Polish–Lithuanian Commonwealth
- Died: 1846 (aged 56–57) Liverpool, England
- Allegiance: Duchy of Warsaw
- Rank: Lieutenant colonel
- Conflicts: Napoleonic Wars; War of the Fifth Coalition; Austro-Polish War; Battle of Kock; French invasion of Russia; November Uprising
- Father: Berek Joselewicz

Józef Berkowicz (1789–1846) also known as Joseph Berkovitz or Berkowitz was a Polish military officer of Jewish origin, the only son of Berek Joselewicz.

== Early life ==
Berkowicz was born in 1789 in Praga.

== Career ==
He took part in the 1809 Battle of Kock, Napoleon's invasion of Russia in 1812 and in the 1830 November Uprising against the Russian Empire. On 21 December 1830 he issued a call to the Polish Jews to support the fight for Polish independence. Berkowicz was an organizer of the Jewish unit of the National Guard, composed of 850 Jewish volunteers. According to Guesnet François of Potsdam University, only 100 Jewish volunteers responded to his appeal. Berkowicz was wounded on various occasions and earned two military awards for valor.

== Later life and death ==
From 1832 to 1836 Berkowicz lived in exile in France, and in 1837 he settled permanently in England.

He died there ten years later in Liverpool in 1846.

He is the author of the novel "Stanislaus, or, the Polish Lancer, in the Suite of Napoleon, from the Island of Elbe", published in 1846 in the UK.

== See also ==
- Leon Berkowicz
- November Uprising
- Stanislas Hernisz
- Jewish City Guard
- Battle of Warsaw (1831)
