= Stanislas Hernisz =

American diplomat

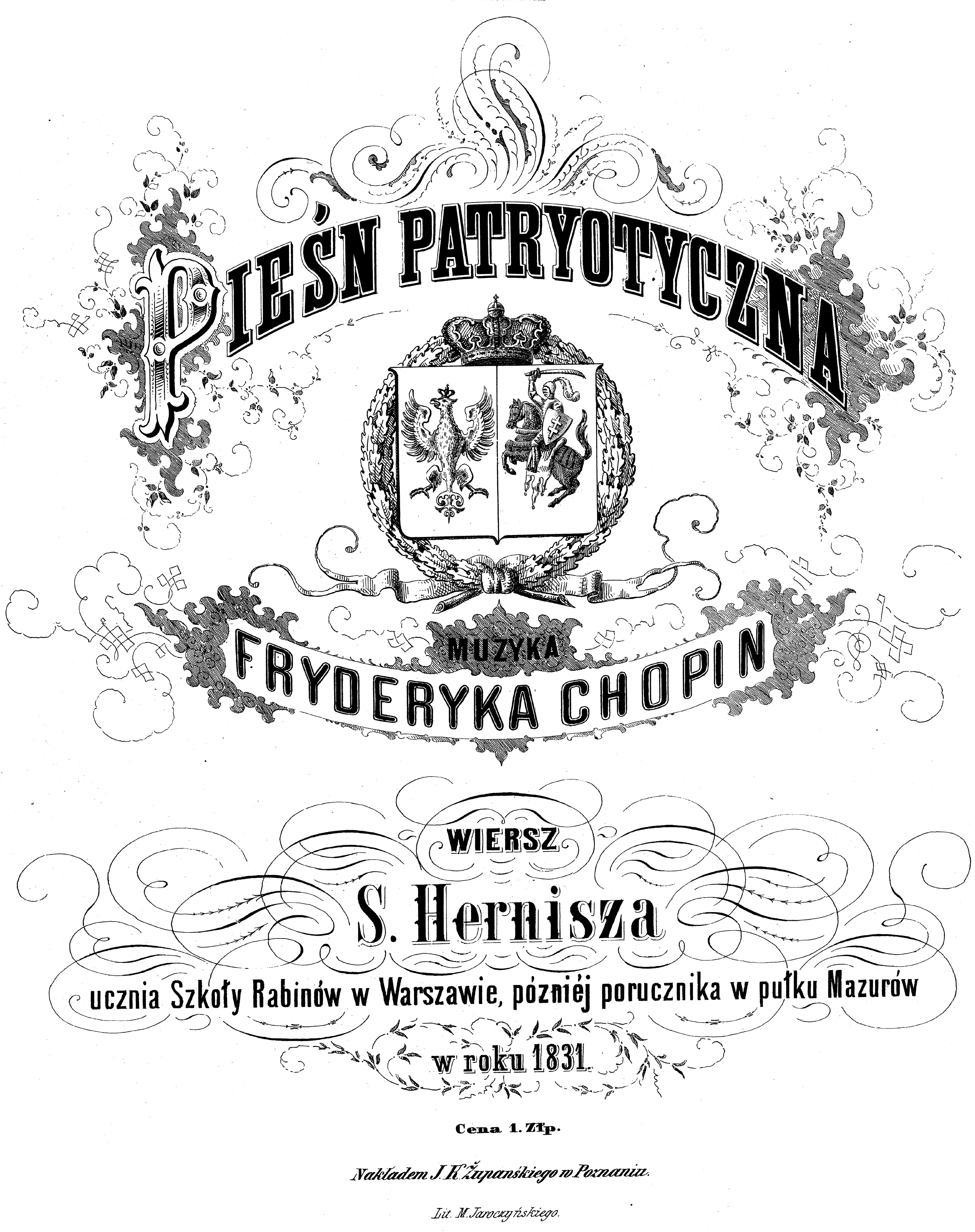
Polish Patriotic Song 1831

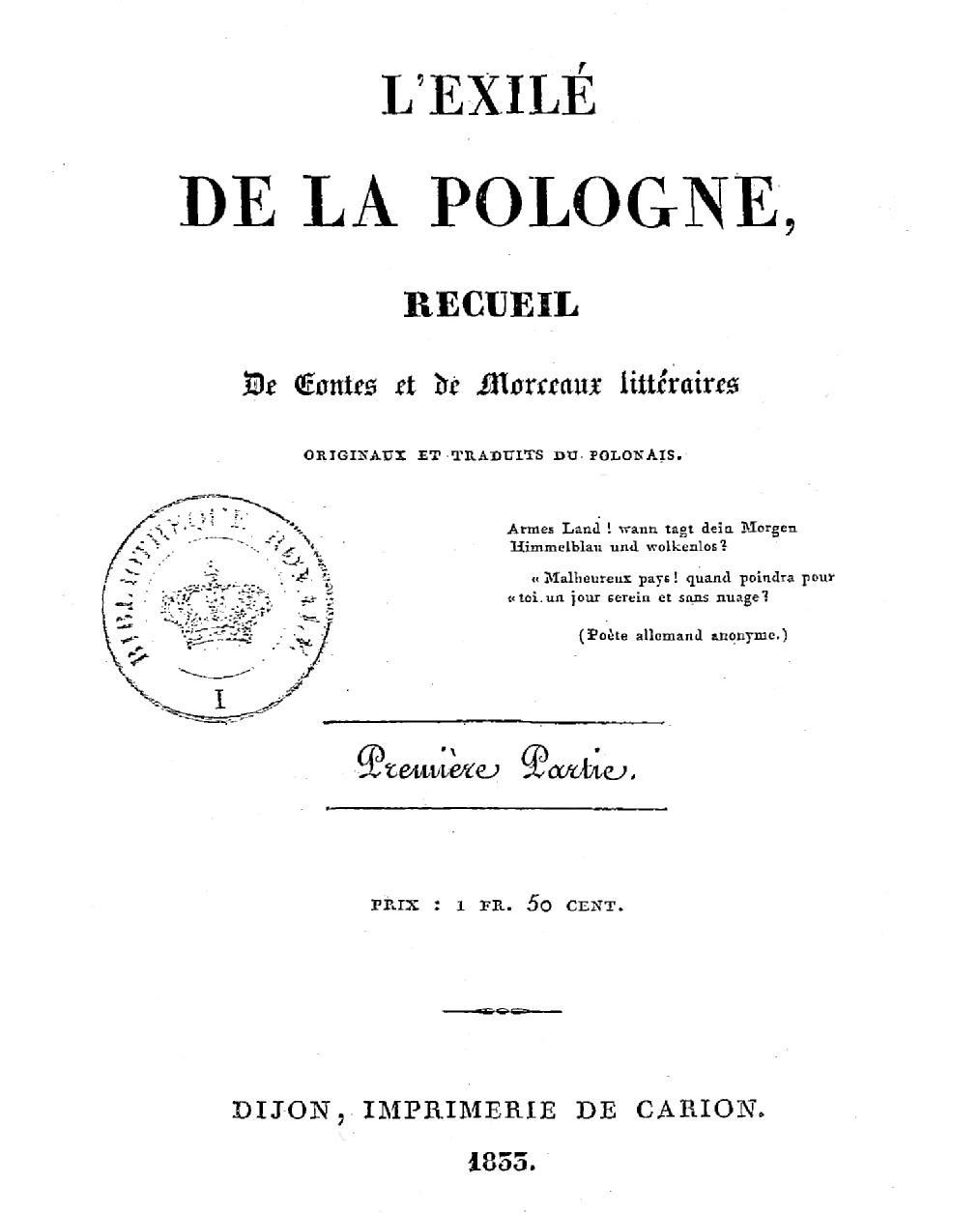
L’Éxilé de la Pologne 1833

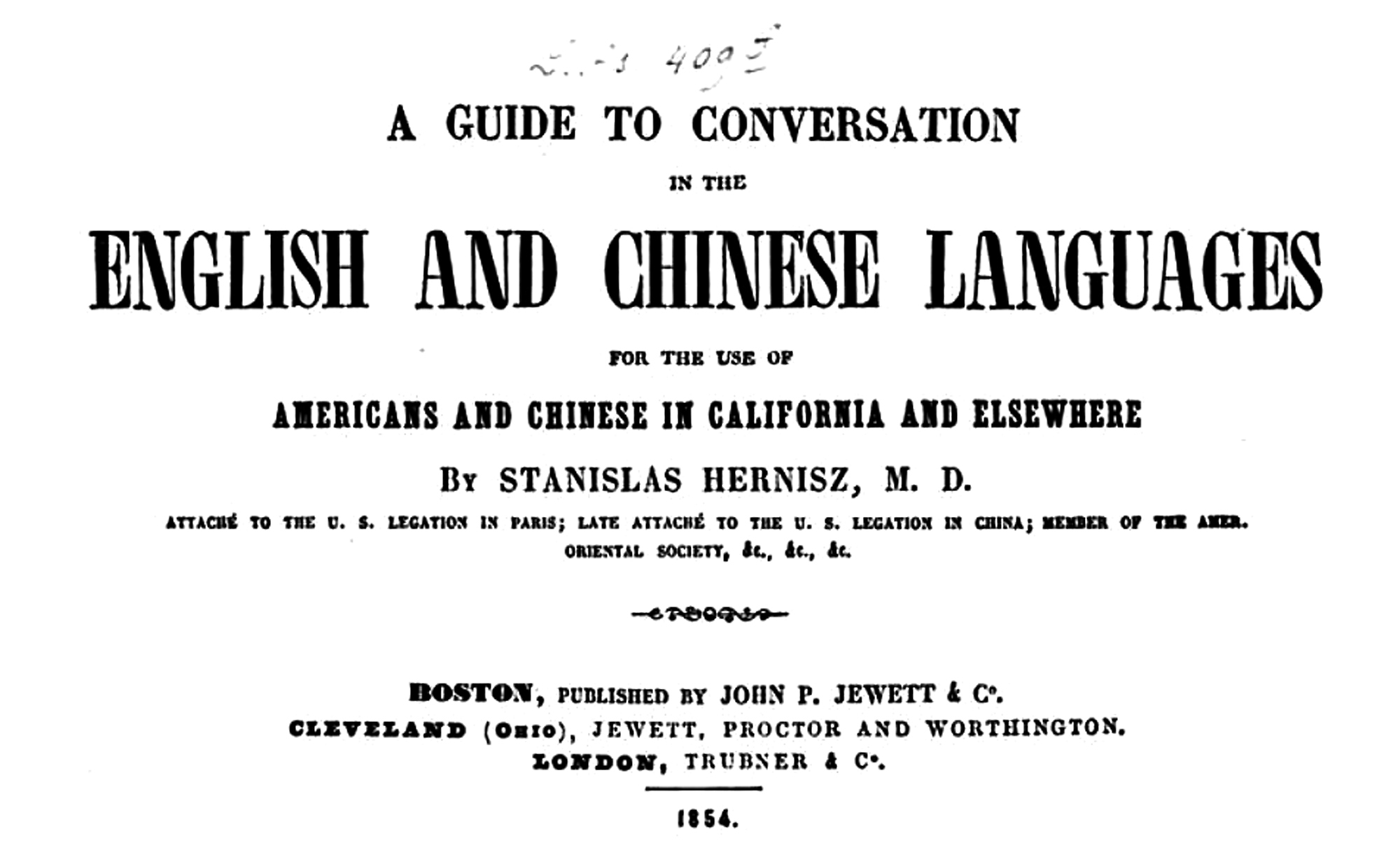
A Guide to Conversation 1854

Stanislas Hernisz (Polish: Stanisław Hernisz) (1805 in Warsaw – 20 April 1866 in London) was a Polish freedom-fighter, journalist, medical doctor, employee of the United States Department of State and sinologist of Jewish descent.

He was born as a son of the Warsaw merchant Gustaw Hernisz and his wife Karolina. He was a pupil of the Warsaw Rabbinical School. After the outbreak of the November Uprising in 1830–1831 against Russians, despite the objection of the conservative Jewish community, together with Józef Berkowicz, son of the Jewish colonel of the Polish Army during the Kościuszko Uprising, Berek Joselewicz, he applied for establishing of a volunteer Jewish battalion.

To encourage the Jewish youth to the participation in the uprising, he wrote the text of the "Patriotic Song” to the music of Frédéric Chopin song “Hulanka” (“Revel” Op. 74 No. 4, 1830), transposed from C major to E major.

He was fighting in the November Uprising with the rank of lieutenant of the First Masur regiment. After the defeat of the uprising he emigrated to France and was engaged mainly in journalism. Together with Jakub Malinowski and Napoleon Kraczak he published 1833 a volume of translations from the Polish language L'exilé de la Pologne (Polish émigrés). In the Paris monthly “Północ” No. 9 from 15 May 1835 he published the article "Polacy wyznania mojżeszowego" (Poles of mosaic faith).

During his stay in France he joined the Paris staff of the United States Department of State, and emigrated later to the United States. During his service he studied medicine and obtained the Medicine Doctor degree. He was sent as Attaché to the U. S. Chinese Mission, where he was also employed as physician. Hernisz became the member of the American Oriental Society. He published 1846 in the Bulletin of the Proceedings of the National Institute for the Promotion of Science a treatise “On the Chinese language”.

In 1854, he published “A Guide to Conversation in the English and Chinese Languages for the Use of Americans and Chinese in California and Elsewhere” in Boston, Massachusetts. This book was used to communicate with Chinese workers during the California Gold Rush (1848-1855). After the home-coming to Boston, Hernisz practicised medicine, emphasizing his knowledge of English, French, Spanish, Italian and German languages.

He died in London during his next journey to China.
