= Kock =

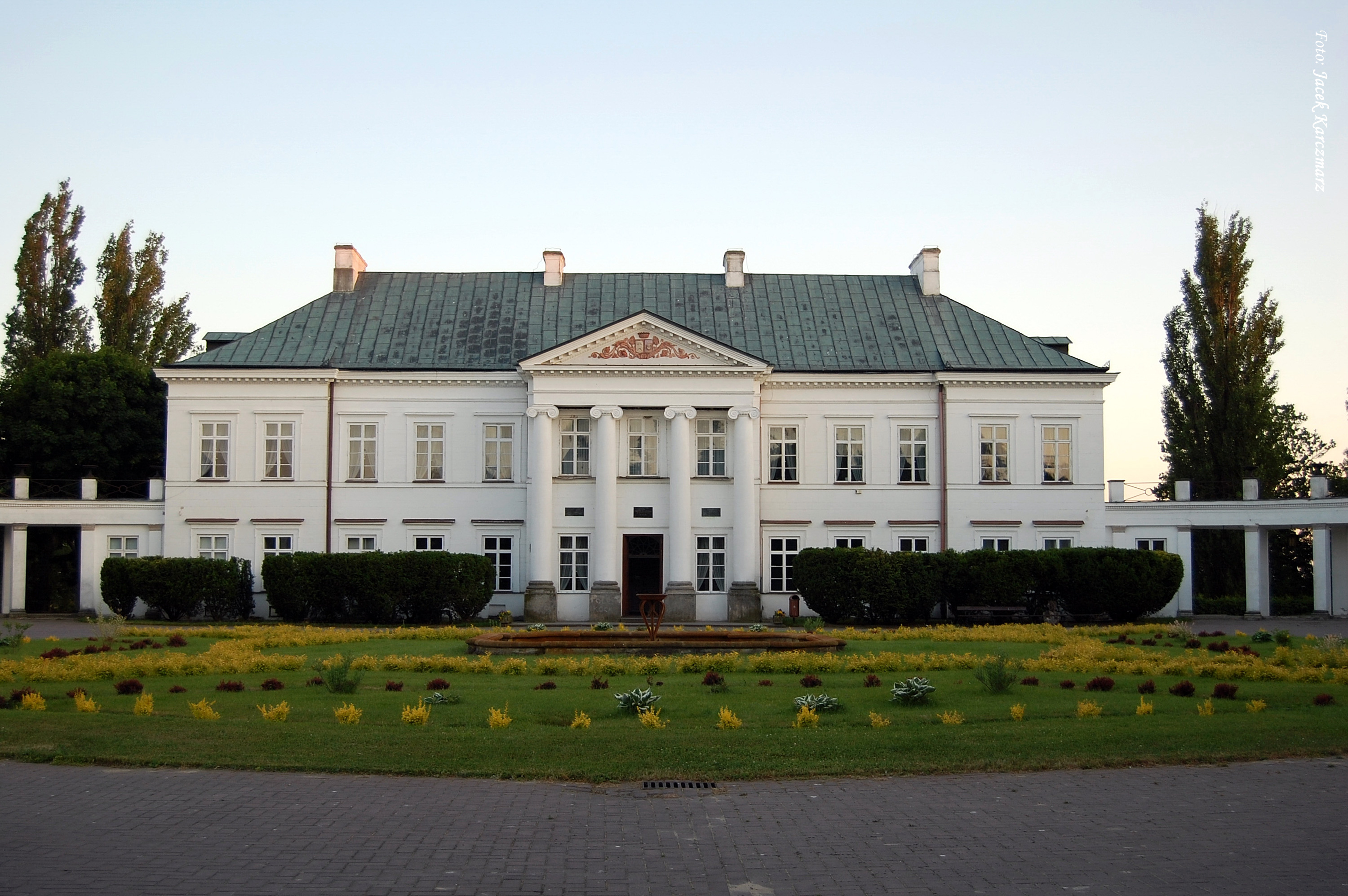
- Jabłonowski Palace

- Coat of arms

- Location within Poland
- Coordinates: 51°39′N 22°27′E
- Country: Poland
- Voivodeship: Lublin
- County: Lubartów
- Gmina: Kock
- Established: 10th century
- Town rights: 1417

Government
  - Mayor: Tomasz Futera (Ind.)

Area
  - Total: 16.78 km^{2} (6.48 sq mi)

Population (2006)
  - Total: 3,478
  - Density: 207.3/km^{2} (536.8/sq mi)
- Time zone: UTC+1 (CET)
  - Summer (DST): UTC+2 (CEST)
- Postal code: 21-150
- Area code: +48 81
- Car plates: LLB
- Website: http://kock.pl/

Kock is a town in Lubartów County, Lublin Voivodeship, in eastern Poland. It is the seat of the administrative district Gmina Kock. Historically Kock belonged to the Polish province of Lesser Poland and was located in its northeastern corner. As of 2004, its population numbered 3,509.

== Name and location ==
Kock is located a few kilometers north of the Wieprz river, approximately 150 meters above sea level, near the Łuków Lowland (Równina Łukowska). In 1952–1954 it was the seat of Gmina Białobrzegi. The town first appears in chronicles in 1258 as Cocsk. In the 15th century, it was called Kocsko or Koczsko, and in 1787, its name was spelled Kocko. Current form has been in use since the 19th century, and the word Kock either comes from the last name or a nickname Kot (a person named so founded the town), or from a plant called kocanka (Helichrysum arenarium), which grows abundantly in the area.

== History ==
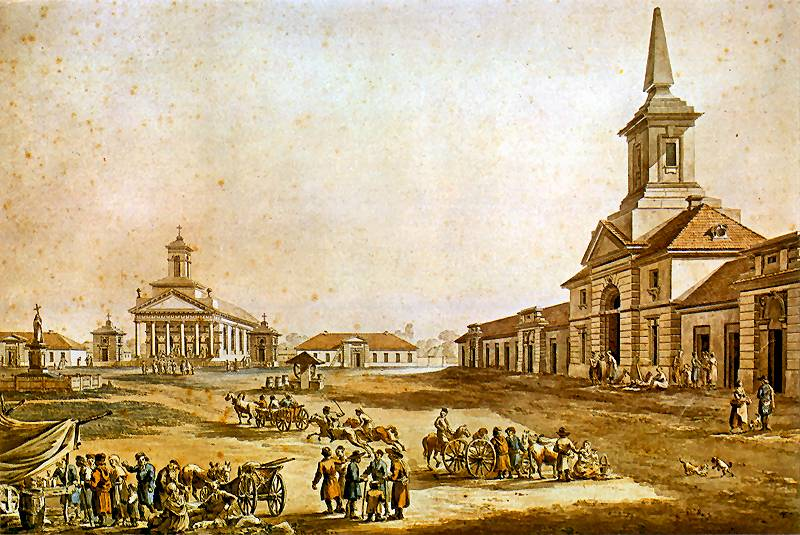
Kock in the 18th century

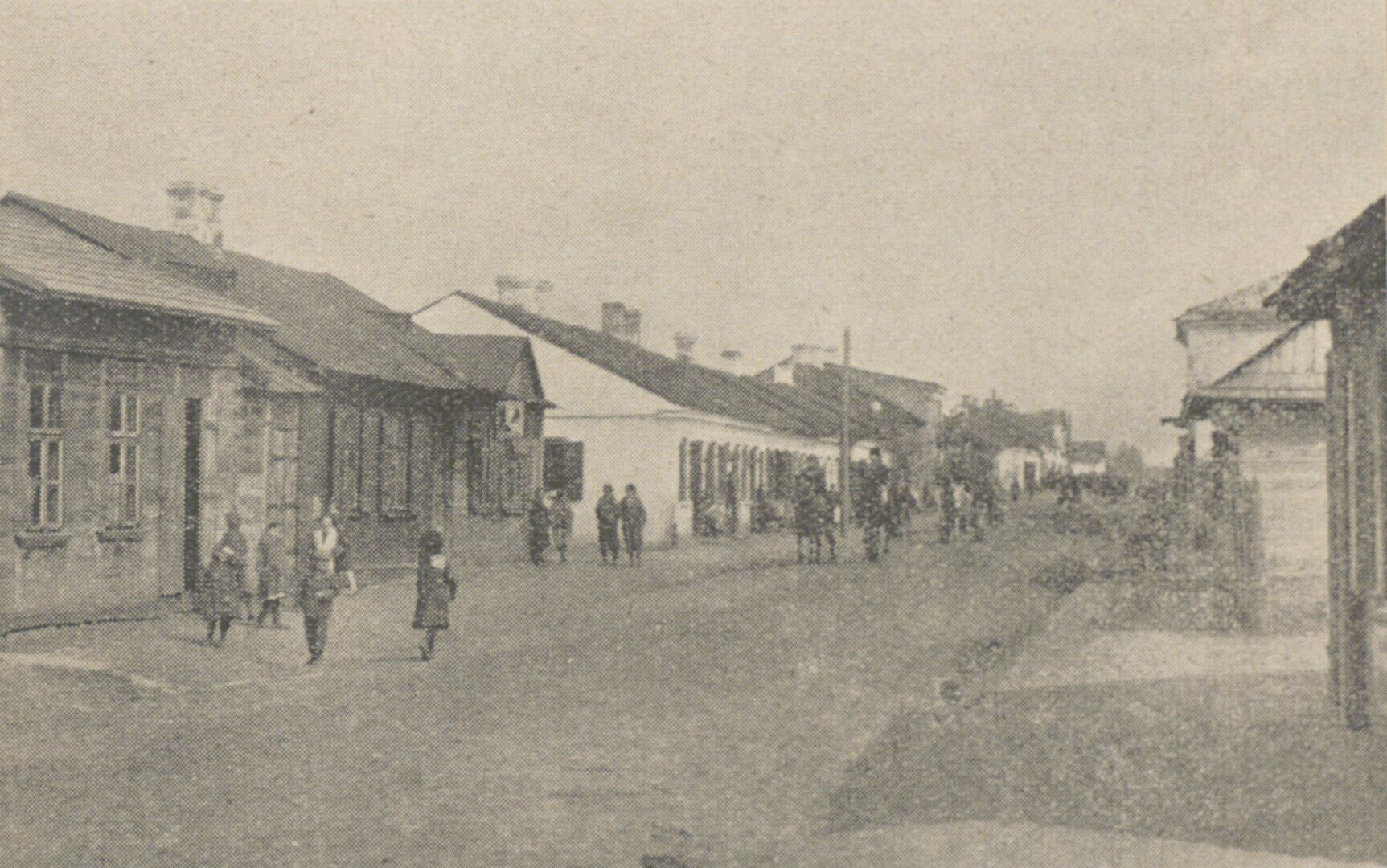
Berek Joselewicz Street, before 1928

Kock has been recognized as an established community since the 12th century. It received its city charter in 1417, by King Władysław II Jagiełło, who granted the charter upon request of Jakub, the Bishop of Płock. From 1512 Kock was shortly a royal town of Poland, and afterwards it was a private town, administratively located in the Lublin Voivodeship in the Lesser Poland Province of the Polish Crown. In 1518 the town belonged to Mikolaj Firlej, Crown Hetman and the Voivode of Sandomierz. The Firlej family owned Kock until the second half of the 18th century, and at that time the town became an important center of the Protestant Reformation in Lesser Poland. Around the year 1750 Kock passed into the hands of Princess Anna Jabłonowska of the Sapieha family, who invested a lot of money and energy into the town, ordering the construction of a town hall, a palace and a church. Furthermore, she established the market square (or rynek). Polish King Stanisław August Poniatowski visited Kock several times. Kock was annexed by Austria in the Third Partition of Poland in 1795. It was regained by Poles in 1809 and included in the short-lived Polish Duchy of Warsaw, and in 1815 it became part of so-called Congress Poland in the Russian Partition of Poland. The residents of the town participated in the January Uprising, for which the Russians deprived Kock of its town rights (1870, recovered in 1915). Several important battles took place at Kock in the 19th and early 20th centuries:

- Battle of Kock (1809), May 5, 1809, during the Polish–Austrian War,
- 17–20 June 1831, and September 12, 1831, during the November Uprising,
- December 25, 1863, during the January Uprising,
- Battle of Kock (1920), August 14–16, 1920, during the Polish–Soviet War,
- Battle of Kock (1939), October 2–6, 1939, during the Polish September Campaign,
- August 1944, during the Operation Tempest.

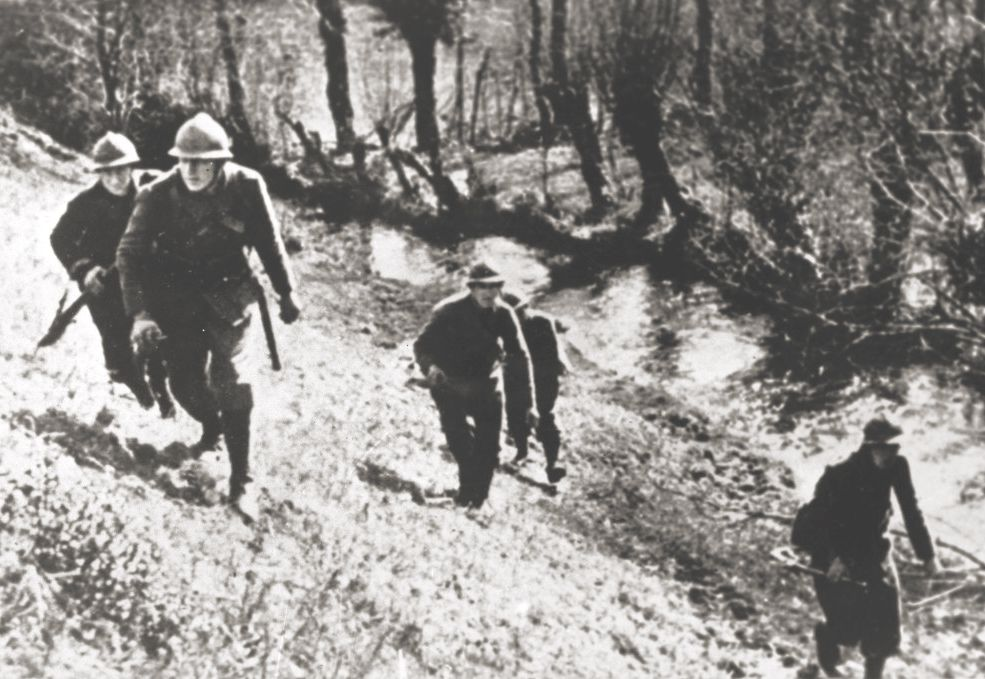
Polish soldiers in the Battle of Kock (1939)

After World War I, Poland regained independence and Kock administratively belonged to the Lublin Voivodeship of Poland. In 1927 large parts of it burned in a fire. The town, located away from rail connections, stagnated.

On October 2–5, 1939, Kock was the site of the last battle between Poland and Germany during the joint German-Soviet invasion of Poland, which started World War II. Afterwards it fell under German occupation, and already in October 1939, the Germans carried out executions of Poles at the local cemetery. During the occupation, the Jewish half of the Kock population, about 2,200 of the town's 4,600 population, was murdered or died of disease and starvation in the ghetto set up by the Germans in Kock. Kock was one of centers of the Home Army, whose units (27th Volhynian Home Army Infantry Division) freed the town on July 22, 1944. Afterwards, the advancing Soviets disbanded Polish soldiers. However, Kock was re-captured by Polish anti-Communist resistance (May 1, 1945).

== Points of interest ==
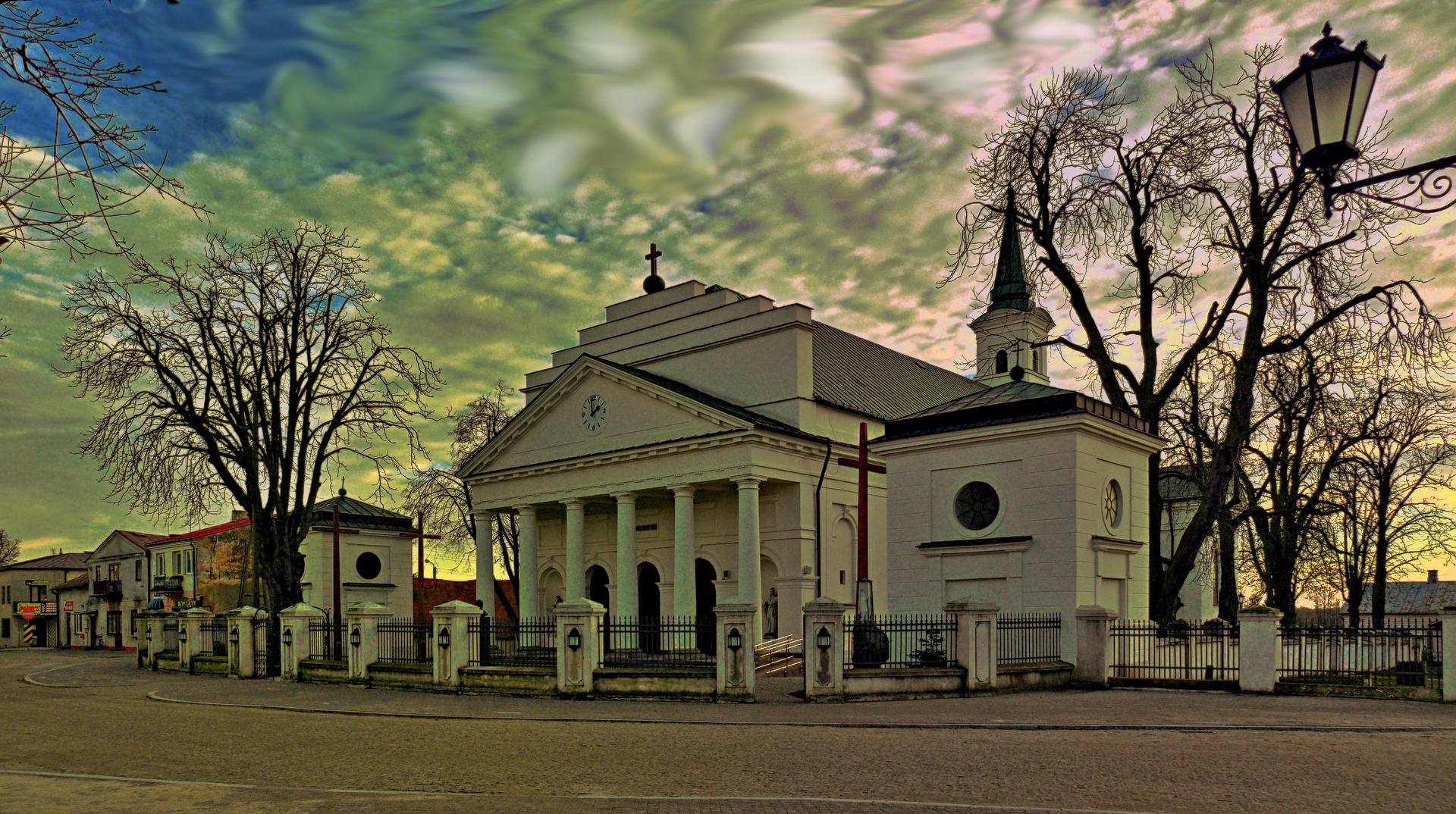
Church of the Assumption of the Virgin Mary

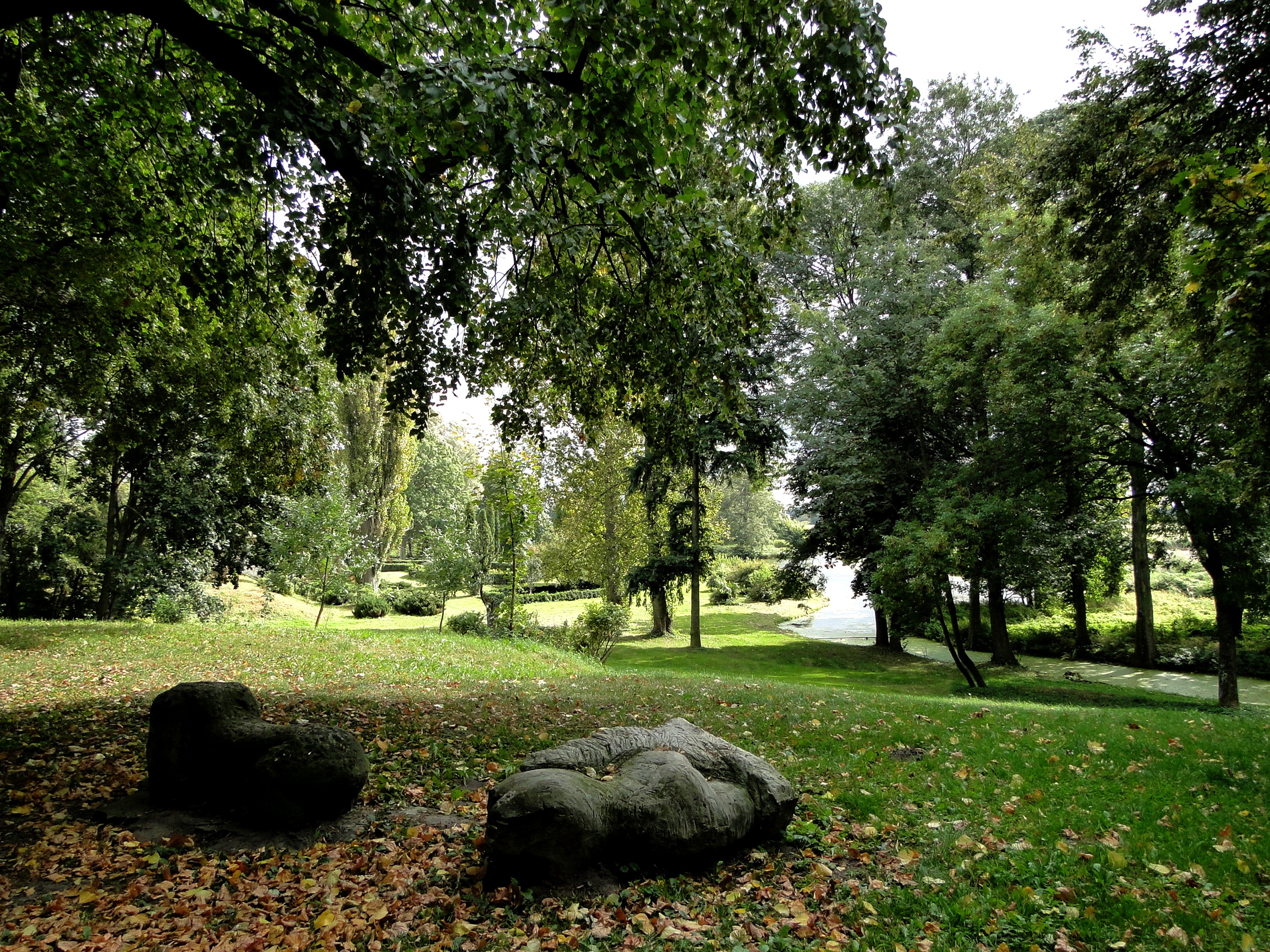
Jabłonowski Park

- Jabłonowski Palace, a classicist palace erected by of Princess Anna Jabłonowska (1770), with an adjacent park
- Parish Church of the Assumption of the Virgin Mary (1779–1782)
- The House of Józef Morgensztern (see Menachem Mendel of Kotzk)
- Military cemetery with the grave of General Franciszek Kleeberg and Polish soldiers fallen in the Battle of Kock (1939)
- Jewish cemetery (18th century)

== Jews of Kock ==
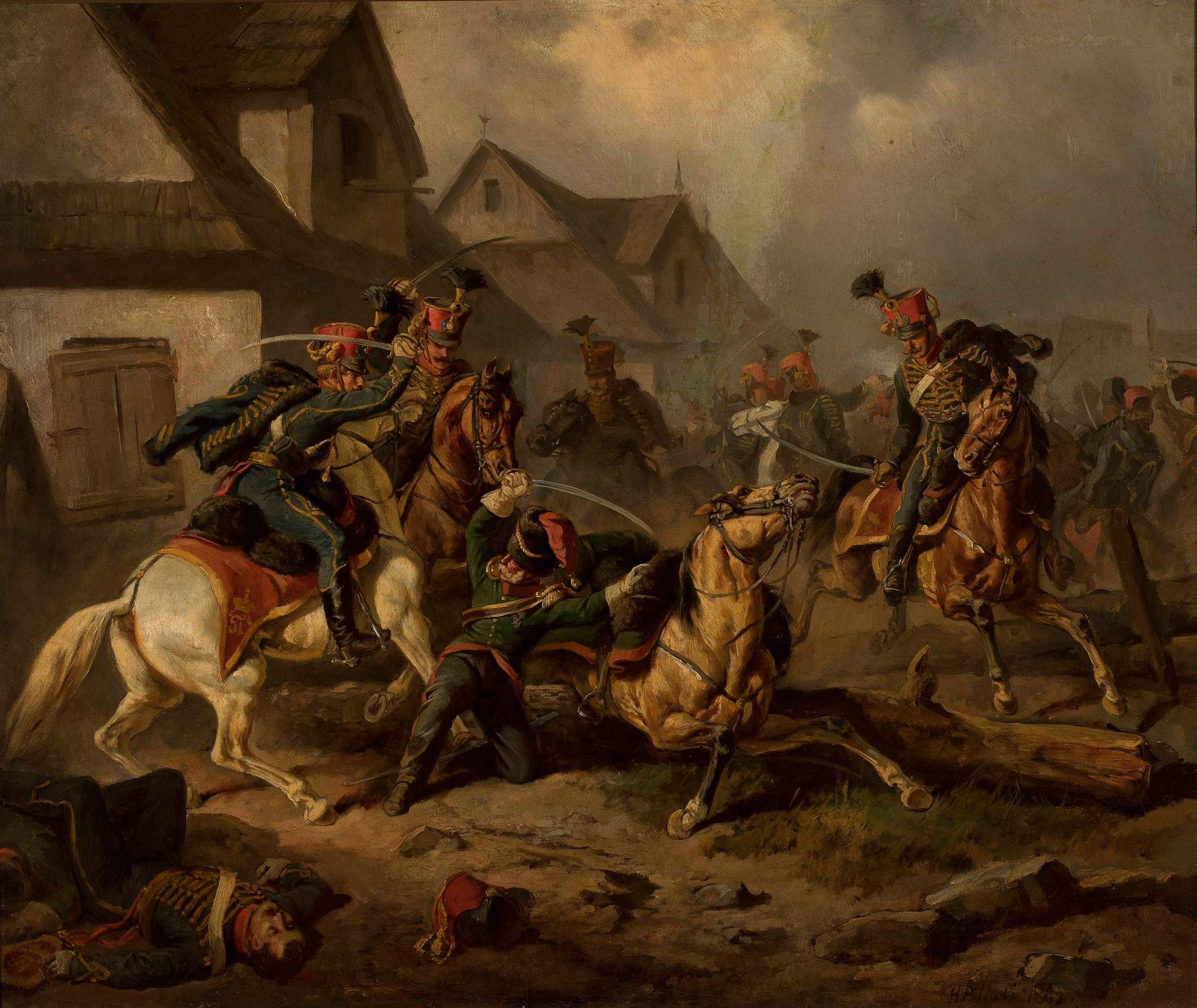
Death of Berek Joselewicz by Henryk Pillati

In the 17th century, a Jewish community was established in the town. In Yiddish, the community is known as Kotzk or Kotsk. Polish colonel of Jewish origin, Berek Joselewicz, leader of one of the first solely ethnic Jewish military units since ancient times, and the first such unit in Poland, was killed in the Battle of Kock (1809) between Poles and Austrians. In the 19th century, the town became an important centre of Hasidism as the longtime home of Rabbi Menachem Mendel of Kotzk, the Kotzker rebbe who established the Kotsk dynasty. During World War II, Jews were brutalized by the German occupiers. They along with deportees from other villages, were confined to a ghetto. Though the pre-war Kock Jewish community was only about 2,200, by late 1939, the ghetto contained 8,000 Jews. Sometimes several dozen people resided in a single room. The overcrowding and lack of adequate sanitation led to a typhus epidemic. In turn, local Christian villagers would not allow Jews to leave the ghetto, so lack of food caused some children to starve.

Conditions improved somewhat in 1940 as Jews were resettled in a different neighborhood. Nonetheless, there were epidemics of typhus and tuberculosis from what was still overcrowding and lack of adequate sanitation. By 1941, many Jews were conscripted for forced labor. In 1942, Kock's Jews were deported. In August, some were sent to Parszew and then on to Treblinka where they were immediately murdered. In September, able men were sent to labor camps, and in October, hundreds were sent to Lukow's ghetto where a few weeks later they too were sent to Treblinka to be murdered. During these months, there were several mass killings of Jews in Kock. Only about 30 of Kock's Jews are thought to have survived the Holocaust during the war. Several were saved by Polish Christian villagers. One survivor was murdered in Kock after liberation. The Jewish community was not reestablished after the war. The brief discussion of the experience of the Jewish population of Kock is described in the Encyclopedia of Camps and Ghettos.
