= Franciszek Kostrzewski =

Polish artist (1826–1911)

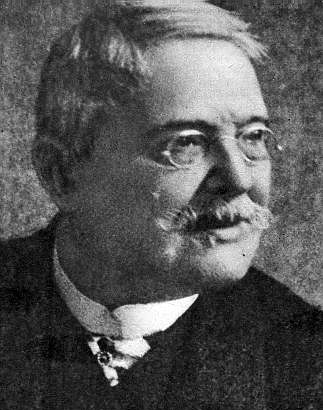
Franciszek Kostrzewski (Date unknown)

Franciszek Kostrzewski (19 April 1826 – 30 September 1911) was a Polish illustrator, cartoonist, caricaturist, comics artist and painter in the Realistic style.

== Biography ==
He was born in Warsaw. His father was the steward of a city estate. In 1831, following the November Uprising, his family moved to a rural estate in the Sandomierz Voivodeship. He later returned to Warsaw to pursue his studies.

By the time he reached the gymnasium level, he had grown tired of the curriculum and decided to become an artist. His father had other plans, however, and found him a position as a midshipman. Not long after, he was fired when his supervisor found him making sketches on important documents. Following that incident, his father finally relented and, in 1844, he enrolled at the new School of Fine Arts in Warsaw.

His teachers there included Jan Feliks Piwarski, Chrystian Breslauer and Aleksander Kokular. During his studies, he travelled around the country, painting landscapes, cityscapes and genre scenes; including time spent in Kielce at the invitation of the prominent art collector Tomasz Zieliński (1802–1858). From 1852 to 1853, he worked under the direction of Henryk Pillati, painting decorations for steamships.

After a trip to Germany and Paris in 1856, he settled in Warsaw and contributed drawings to several publications, including Tygodnik Illustrowany, Kłosy (Ears) and Wędrowiec (The Wanderer). He was also one of many who illustrated the works of Adam Mickiewicz, as well as the lesser-known works of Władysław Syrokomla and Teofil Lenartowicz.

Over time, his illustrations came to be less critical or satirical and represent a realistic chronicle of life in the capital. He exhibited frequently at the Kraków Society of Friends of Fine Arts and its counterpart in Warsaw, as well as at several commercial salons. He published his memoirs in 1891.

== Selected works ==
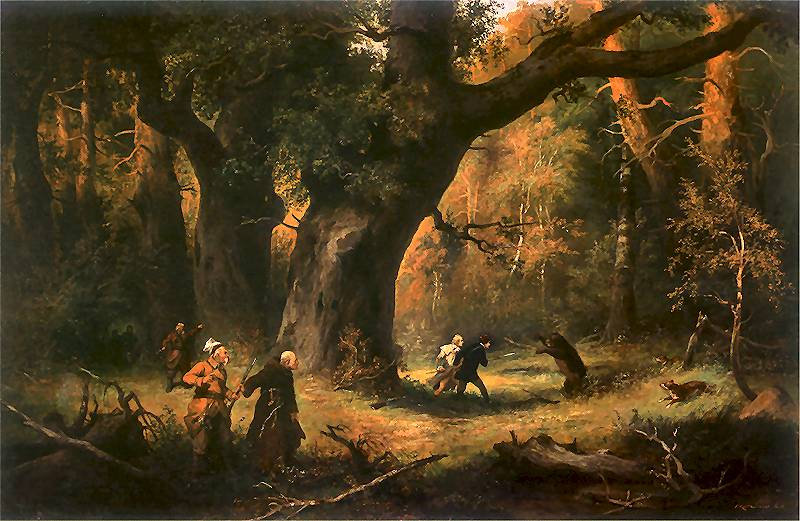
"Hunting": Illustration for Pan Tadeusz

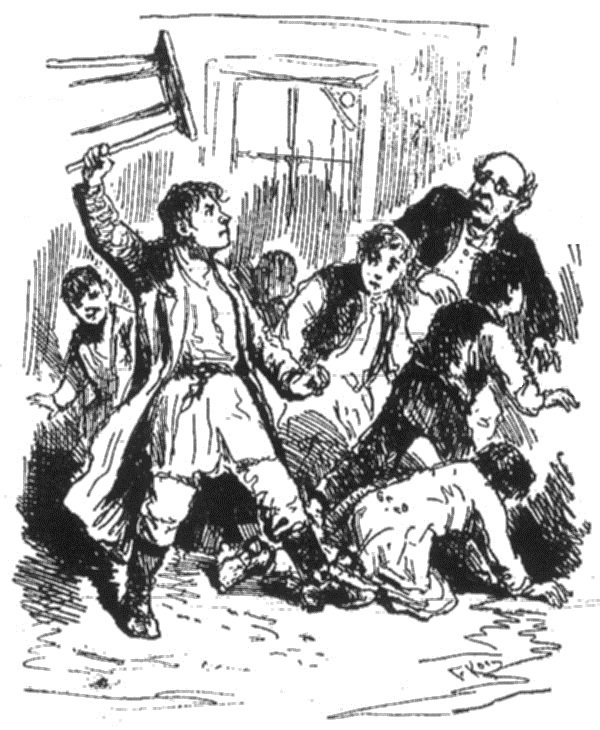
Illustration for
Grześ the Illiterate by
Michał Bałucki

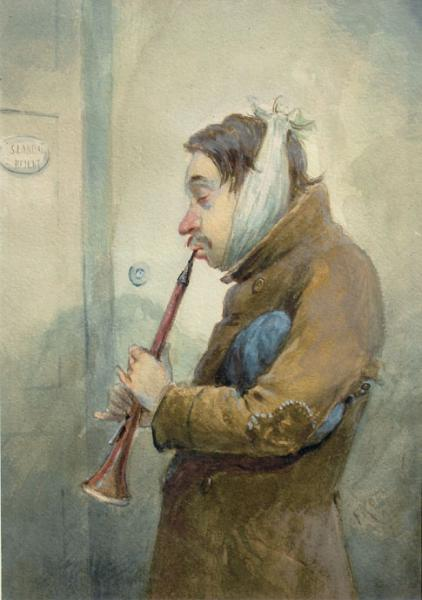
The Piper

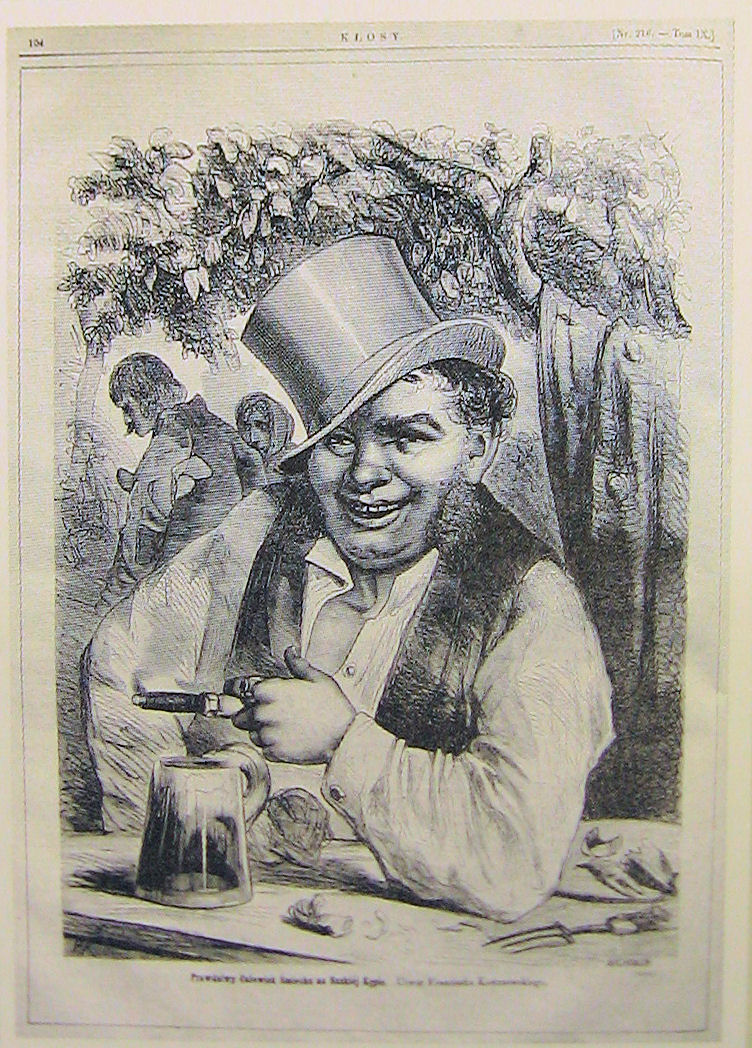
A True Man of Laughter in
Saska Kępa

== See also ==
- Maria Zandbang
