= Battle of Kock (1809) =

Battle during the Napoleonic Wars

- Part of Austro-Polish War of the Fifth Coalition
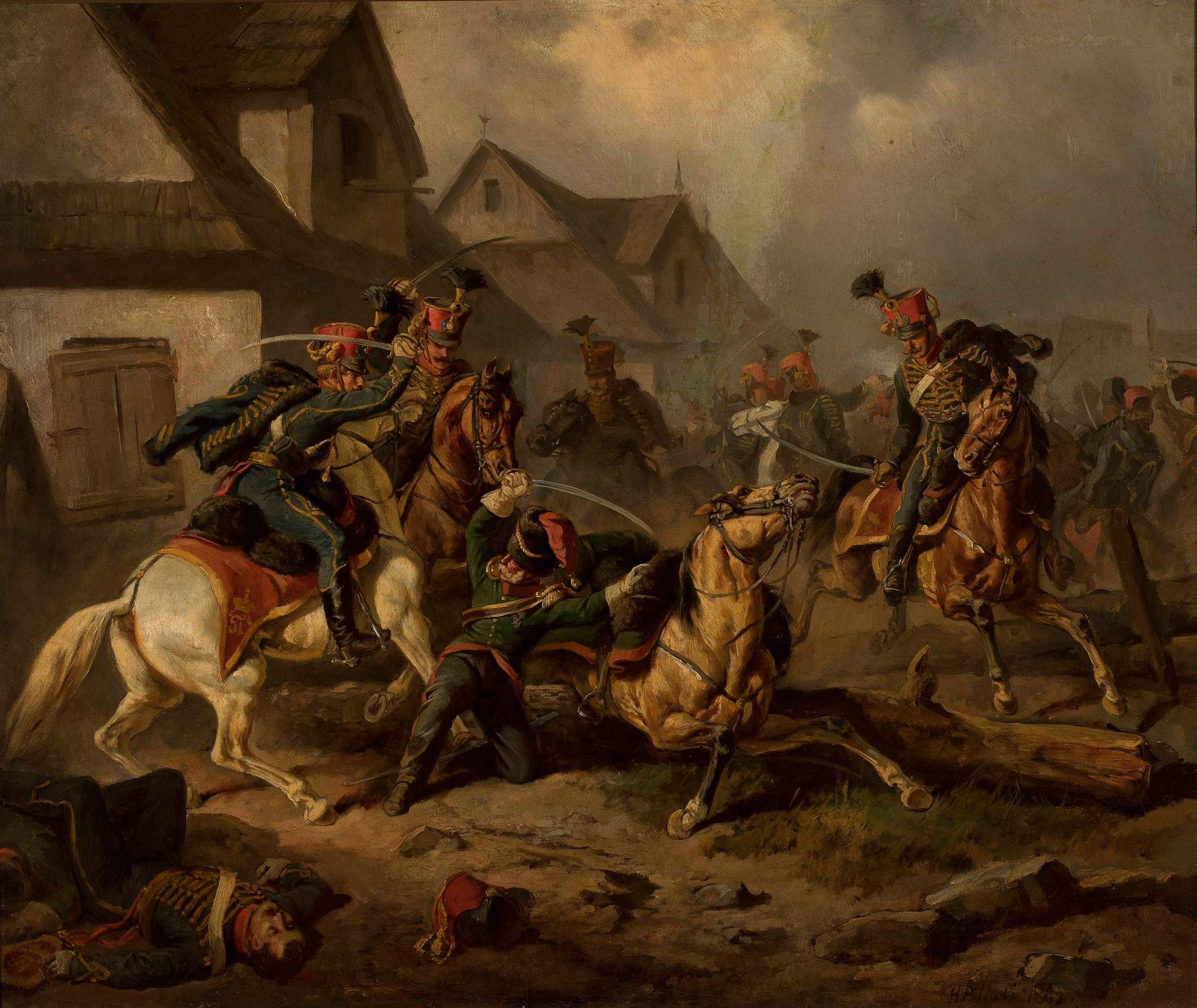
- The Death of Berek Joselewicz by Henryk Pillati (National Museum of Poland)
Date	2 May -? 1809
Location	Kock, Poland 51°39′N 22°27′E
Result	Polish victory

Belligerents
(Poland) Duchy of Warsaw	Austrian Empire

Commanders and leaders
(Poland) Berek Joselewicz †	(Austrian Empire) Friedrich Hoditz

Strength
Squadron of the 5th Riflemen's Regiment	2 Squadrons of Hussars - about 300 cavalry

Casualties and losses
2 killed (Note: Including Lt. Col. Joselewicz.); 7 wounded	11 killed 8 wounded 8 captured

The Battle of Kock was fought in 1809 during the Napoleonic Wars, near the town of Kock in Poland.

The battle saw the death of Polish Army colonel Berek Joselewicz, fighting against the Austrian Empire for the freedom of Poland.

== Course ==
Lieutenant Colonel Berek Joselewicz was in command of a squadron of the 5th Mounted Rifles Regiment in the vanguard of the Polish Army and forming part of cavalry brigadier general Rożniecki's formation. The Polish cavalry had been tasked with clearing Austrian troops out of the way of the main force and capturing crossings over the river Wieprz.

The only Austrian forces in the area withdrew to Kock on 2 May - this was formed of two squadrons (totalling around 300 men) of the 1st Hussars, commanded by major Friedrich Hoditz. The force was tasked with destroying all the crossings over the Wieprz. On 7 May Joselewicz attacked the Austrians at the head of his squadron. After a brief struggle, the hussars retreated in disarray and the bridge was captured intact. Joselewicz was killed - pursuing the fleeing hussars too closely, he was wounded, surrounded and killed despite pleading to surrender. His precise gravesite is unknown, though a cenotaph to him stands on the road between Kock and Bialobrzegi.

Polish casualties were 1 dead and 7 injured, whilst the Austrians lost 11 killed, 8 wounded and 8 captured, including one captain. After the battle Hoditz withdrew towards Lublin. Almost immediately after the battle, colonel Turno (commander of the 5th Mounted Rifles Regiment) wrote a letter to Hoditz criticising his soldiers' behaviour.
