= Fryderyk Krzysztof Dietrich =

German-born Polish engraver and civil servant

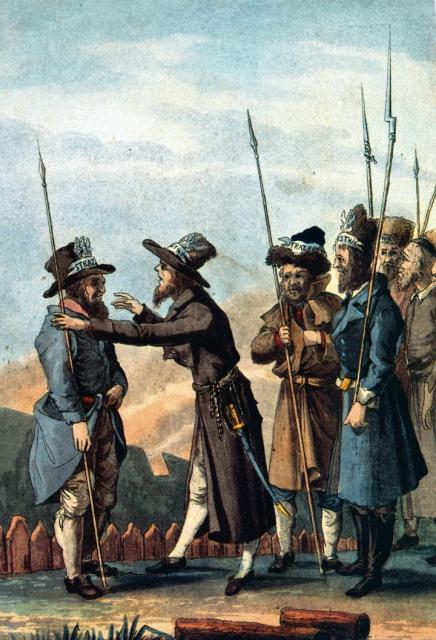
Jewish Security Guard, an 1831 engraving by Fryderyk Krzysztof Dietrich

Fryderyk Krzysztof Dietrich (German: Friedrich Christoph Dietrich; 1779–1847) was a German-born Polish engraver and civil servant.

== Biography ==
He was born on 3 April 1779 in Öhringen in the Duchy of Württemberg. His father was a goldsmith at the court of Prince Hohenlohe. Early in his life he took classes in civil engineering, studied painting in the studio of Johann Jakob Schillinger and architecture in the team of Johann Georg Glenck. He then left for Augsburg to study the art of engraving with Johann D. Herz and then with Christian Haldenwang in Karlsruhe. In 1804 he returned to his native town of Öhringen and became a court engraver for the princes of Hohenlohe. When one of his benefactors died, he left the court in search for a new job.

He stayed briefly in Amsterdam, London, Berlin and Poznań before finally settling in Warsaw, where he opened the first engraving shop in the city. In 1819 his new benefactor, Stanisław Kostka Potocki, awarded him with a government contract for 24 pictures of royal graves of the kings of Poland, eventually published in the book Monumenta Regnum Poloniae Cracoviensia. He also started a successful career as a civil servant and clerk. Shortly before his death he moved to Łódź, where he died on 25 May 1847, during a severe typhoid fever epidemics. One of his six children, Fryderyk Adolf Dietrich, continued his engraving shop in Warsaw.
