= Artur Oppman =

Polish poet

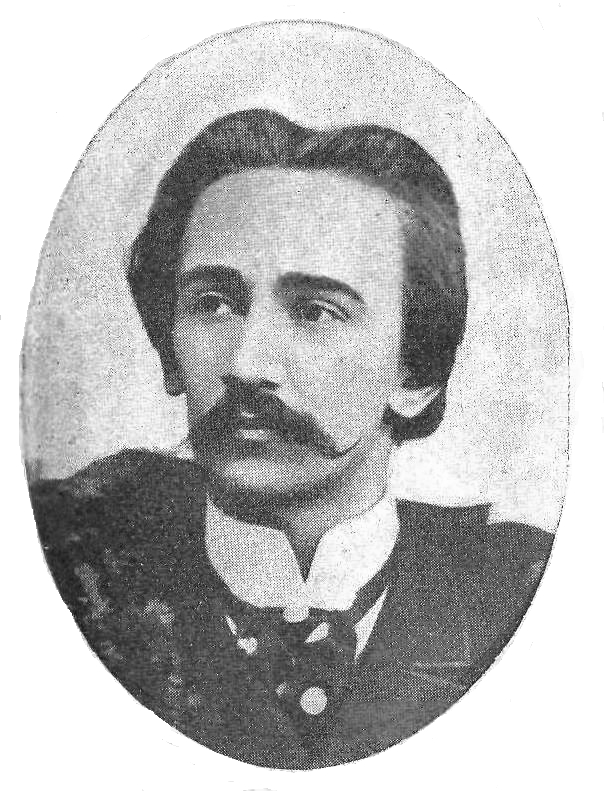
- Born: Artur Franciszek Oppman; 14 August 1867; Warsaw, Russian Empire (Partitioned Poland)
- Died: 4 November 1931 (aged 64); Warsaw, Second Polish Republic
- Education: Jagiellonian University
- Writing career
- Language: Polish
- Notable work: Legendy warszawskie
- Literary movement: Young Poland

Signature
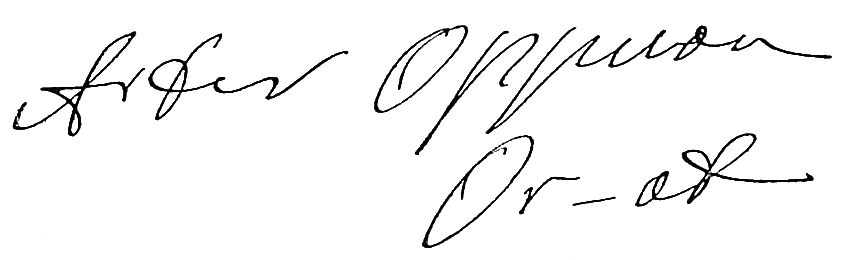

Artur Franciszek Oppman (14 August 1867 – 4 November 1931) was a Young Poland poet who wrote under the pen name "Or-Ot".

== Life ==
Artur Oppman was born 14 August 1867, in Warsaw to a burgher family with German roots, which had arrived in Poland in 1708 from Thuringia. The family quickly became attached to Poland and cultivated Polish patriotism; Artur's grandfather took part in the Polish November 1830 Uprising, and his father in the January 1863 Uprising.

Oppman attended a Warsaw gymnasium (secondary school), but because of severe Russification pressure (Warsaw was part of the Russian partition of Poland) he switched to an alternate trade school. There he began writing poetry.

His peculiar pen-name began with the publication of his second poem, when an abbreviation of his name, "Ar-Op", was misrendered by the type-setter as "Or-Ot".

Oppman's early poems were published in Kurier Warszawski (The Warsaw Courier), Wędrowiec (The Wanderer), and Kurier Codzienny (The Daily Courier), which sought to promote new talent. Between 1883 and 1885 he also published in Tygodnik Ilustrowany (The Illustrated Weekly), Kłosy (Ears [fruiting bodies of grain plants]), and Świt (Dawn).

From 1890 to 1892 he studied philology in Kraków at the Jagiellonian University. He was particularly interested in 16th-century Polish language and literature.

In 1892 he married Władysława Trynkiewicz and discontinued his studies, returning to Warsaw. He frequented the city's Old Town and studied the borough's people, lifestyle, customs, and local legends. In 1893, based on these experiences, he published a collection of poems, Ze Starego Miasta (From the Old Town), and in 1894 a related volume of Pieśni (Songs).

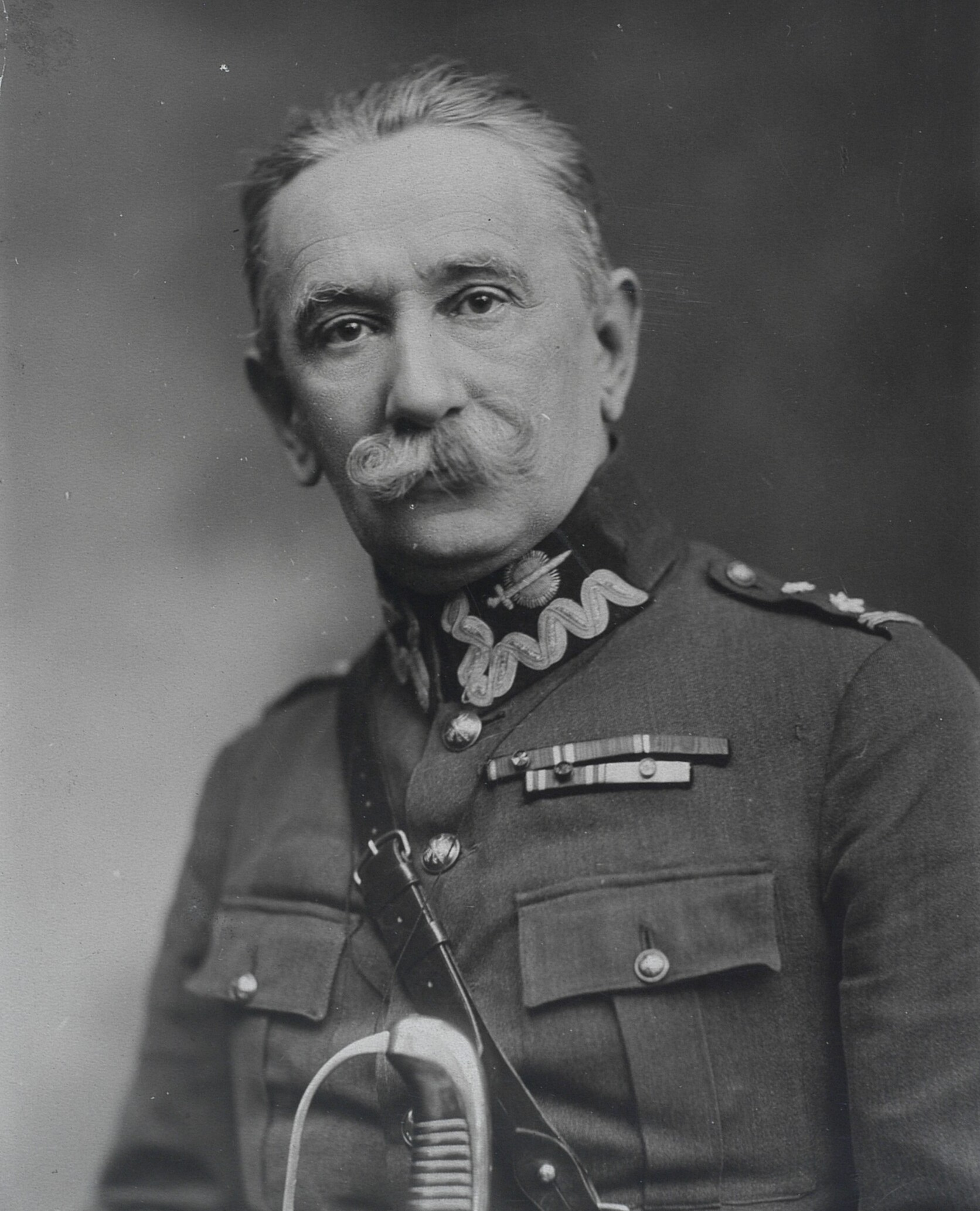
Oppman circa 1930

In 1920 he enlisted in the army of resurrected Poland, as an infantry private. He was made editor of the Army's magazine, Żołnierz Polski (The Polish Soldier).

== Works ==
Especially popular were Oppman's poems celebrating the charms of Warsaw's Old Town.

From 1901 to 1905 he edited Wędrowiec (The Wanderer).

Oppman established extensive contacts in Warsaw's literary world, meeting often with Bolesław Prus, Stefan Żeromski, Felicjan Faleński, Władysław Reymont, Kazimierz Przerwa-Tetmajer, Bolesław Leśmian, Antoni Lange, Wojciech Kossak, Jan Lechoń, and others.

Oppman also wrote many works for children, and edited calendars, almanacs, and poetry compilations.

== See also ==
- List of Poles
