= Berek Joselewicz =

Polish Jewish military commander (1764–1809)

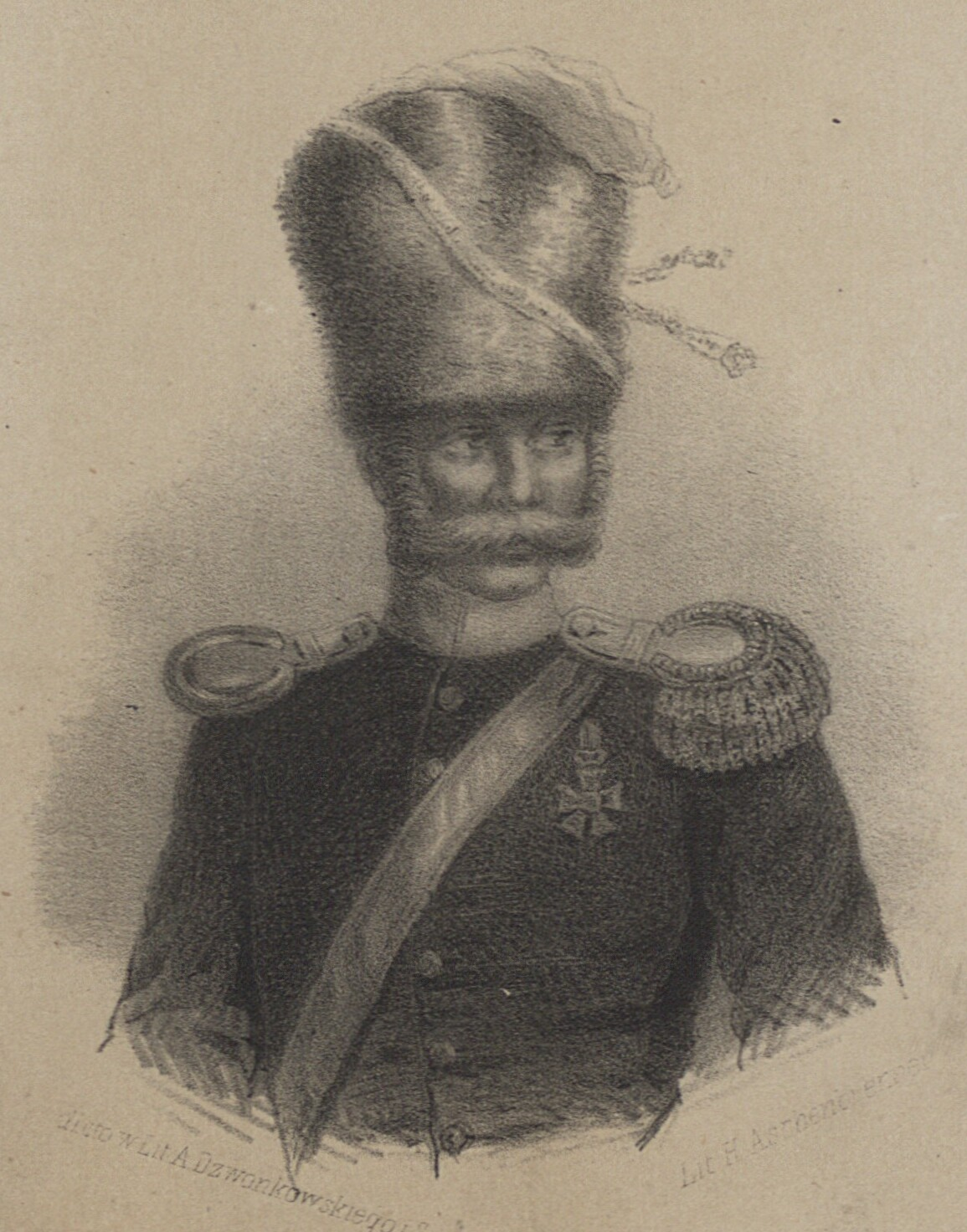
- Lithograph, published 1904
- Born: Dow Baer Joselewicz; 17 September 1764; Kretinga, Samogitia, Polish–Lithuanian Commonwealth
- Died: 5 May 1809 (aged 44) Kock, Duchy of Warsaw
- Allegiance: Polish–Lithuanian Commonwealth; First French Republic; First French Empire; Duchy of Warsaw
- Rank: Colonel
- Conflicts: Kościuszko Uprising; Battle of Praga; French Revolutionary Wars; War of the Second Coalition; Italian campaigns; Battle of Trebbia; Battle of Novi; Battle of Hohenlinden; Napoleonic Wars; War of the Third Coalition; Battle of Austerlitz; War of the Fourth Coalition; Battle of Friedland; War of the Fifth Coalition; Austro-Polish War; Battle of Kock (1809) †
- Awards: Virtuti Militari
- Children: Józef Berkowicz

Berek Joselewicz (17 September 1764 – 15 May 1809) was a Polish Jewish colonel of the Polish Army during the Kościuszko Uprising. Joselewicz commanded the first Jewish military formation in modern history excluding Prince Potemkin's Israelovsky Regiment. He was also a merchant and financial agent of the Polish magnate Prince Massalski.

== Early life ==
Dow Baer (Berek) Joselewicz was born in Kretinga, in the Duchy of Samogitia of the Grand Duchy of Lithuania, a member country of the Polish–Lithuanian Commonwealth. He worked as a financial agent for a local Lithuanian magnate, the Lord of Kretinga and Bishop of Vilnius Prince Massalski. Joselewicz often travelled abroad in pursuit of various tasks, during which he learned to speak French. He spent some time in Paris during the beginning of the French Revolution, and it is thought that this may have later inspired him to join Tadeusz Kościuszko, who advocated similar causes of brotherhood and equality.

== Kościuszko Uprising ==
Joselewicz initially served in the militia before petitioning Kościuszko for permission to form an all-Jewish unit. On 17 September 1794 Kościuszko officially announced the creation of the unit. Joselewicz, along with another Jew named Józef Aronowicz, issued a patriotic call-to-arms in Yiddish denouncing Russia and Prussia, eliciting hundreds of volunteers, mostly poor trade workers and artisans. Five hundred men were eventually accepted and formed into a cavalry regiment (The Old Testament Light Horse Regiment). At Joselewicz's request, they were allowed to keep their religious customs, including access to kosher foods, abstaining from combat on the Sabbath when possible, and growing their beards. Joselewicz's unit was popularly known as "the Beardlings". They took part in the Battle of Praga, in which the unit was wiped out, with only a few men (including Joselewicz) surviving the battle. Joselewicz himself was taken prisoner by the Russians.

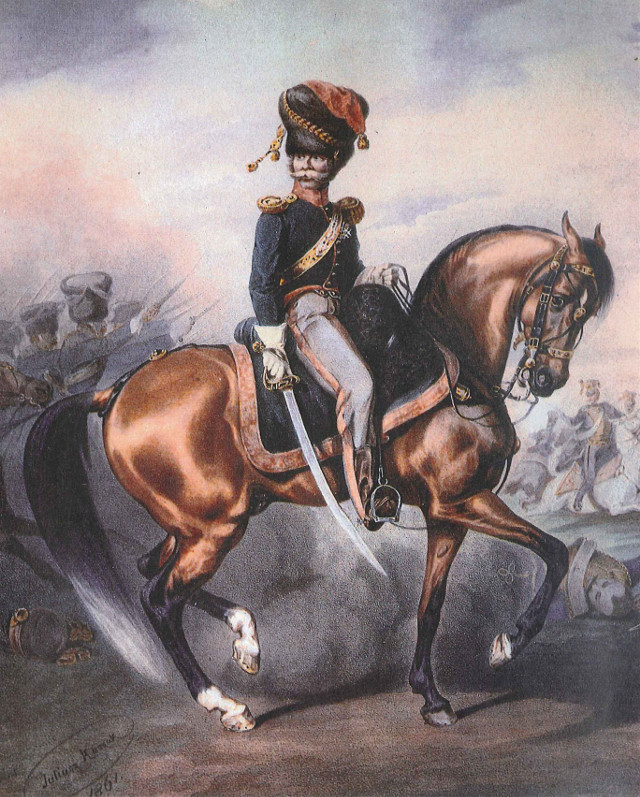
Berek Joselewicz by Juliusz Kossak

== Polish Legions ==
After the defeat of the Kościuszko Uprising, Joselewicz left for Galicia and then for Italy. There he joined the Polish Legions under Henryk Dąbrowski. As a commander of a sabre company in Polish cavalry units, he fought in various battles during the Napoleonic Wars period. Among them were the battles of Trebbia, Novi, Hohenlinden, Austerlitz and Friedland.

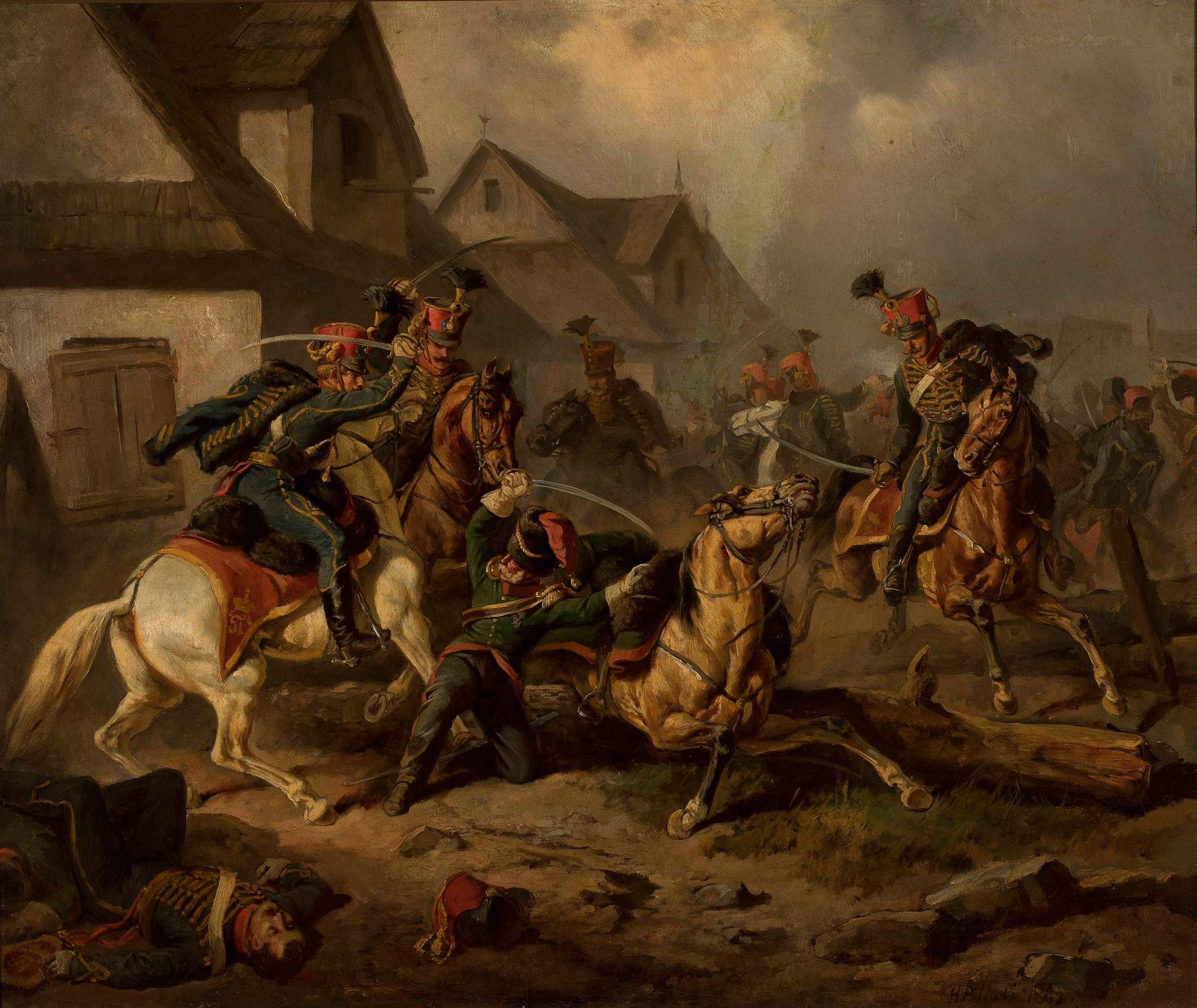
The Death of Berek Joselewicz, by Henryk Pillati

== Army of the Grand Duchy of Warsaw ==
He remained in the army as a squadron leader in the 5th Mounted Rifles Regiment following the creation of the Duchy of Warsaw in 1807. From 1807 he fought in various battles in Poland.

=== Austro-Polish War ===
He was killed in the Battle of Kock in 1809 during an encounter with a unit of Austrian hussars, and today his grave has become a popular tourist attraction.

== Legacy ==
The historical Polish proverb "Perish like Berek at Kock" ("Zginął jak Berek pod Kockiem.") describes someone disappearing without a trace. Another historical folk song describes Berek:

"This was Berek, famous Jew, Man of duty, righteous Pole. Not with wine, not with swindle but with blood he paid for glory!"

Original text: "Był to Berek, sławny Żyd, Człek sumienny – Polak prawy. Nie kwaterką – ni szacherką, Lecz się krwią dorobił sławy!".

He was honored by a postage stamp as "A Jewish Fighter for Polish Freedom", issued jointly by Polish and Israeli postal services.

According to Derek Penslar, Berek was not a Polish patriot but rather "an adventurer and activist".

"Berek was not so much a Polish patriot as an adventurer and activist who sought to enhance his own personal honor as well as that of the Jews under his command. Although Berek is most famous for his service for Poland, in 1796 he proposed to the Habsburg emperor the raising of a corps of six thousand to eight thousand Jews who would be divided into cavalry and infantry units to fight against the French.”

There are streets named after him in many Polish towns including Warsaw, Kraków, Łódź, Częstochowa, Zawichost, Biłgoraj, Radomsko, Chrzanów, Będzin, Lubartów and Żarki. In Góra Kalwaria, the street is now called Firefighters Street.

== Awards ==
He was awarded the Knight's Cross of the Virtuti Militari medal and the Legion of Honour with a Golden Cross for his merits.

== Family ==
Berek's son, Józef Berkowicz (1789–1846), also fought in the Battle of Kock, and later served as a squadron chief during the November Uprising of 1830, during which he also attempted to convince Jewish soldiers to desert the Russian army and join the Poles. Berkowicz later moved to England and wrote a novel. Berek's widow and son received a pension until 1831.

== See also ==
- Jewish City Guard
