= Tygodnik Illustrowany =

Warsaw illustrated weekly magazine for culture and society

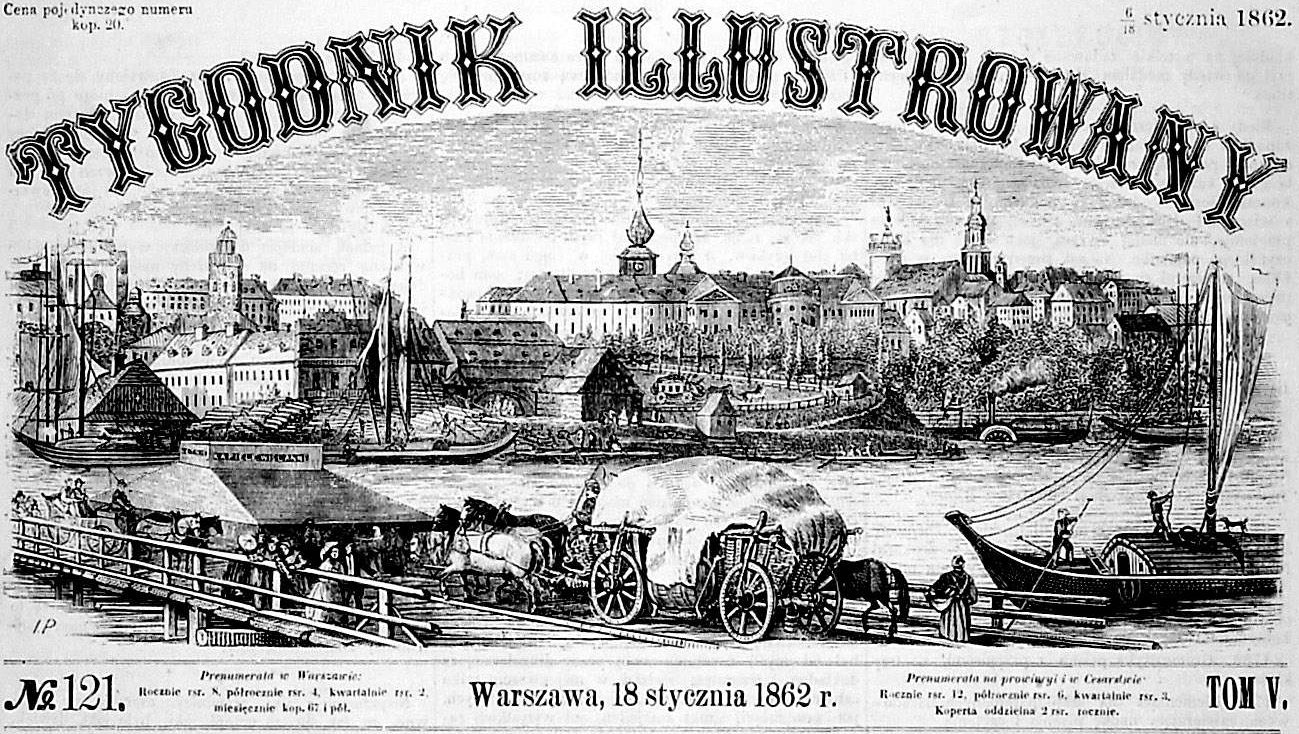
- Tygodnik Illustrowany no. 121 (1862)
- Type: Weekly magazine
- Founder: Józef Unger
- Publisher: Gebethner i Wolff
- Founded: 1859
- Ceased publication: 1939
- Language: Polish language
- Headquarters: Warsaw
- Circulation: 20,000 (as of 1909)

Tygodnik Illustrowany (Polish: [tɨˈɡɔdɲik ilustrɔˈvanɨ], The Illustrated Weekly) was a Polish language weekly magazine published in Warsaw from 1859 to 1939. The magazine focus was on literary, artistic and social issues.

== History ==
It is said to have been one of the most important and popular Polish magazines of the period, profitable and widely respected. It was particularly popular among the inteligencja social group. It was the oldest cultural periodical published in Warsaw.

The magazine was first published by Józef Unger; later it was taken over by the company Gebether i Wolff. Editors included: Ludwik Jenike, Józef Wolff, Artur Oppman, Adam Grzymała-Siedlecki, Zdzisław Dębicki, Piotr Choynowski, W. Gebethner, Jan Robert Gebethner, W. Czarski and C. Staszewicz. In 1909 its circulation was reported to be about 20,000.

The magazine commonly published articles on history of Poland and Polish society, including archaeological, ethnographic and similar essays. It also published texts on the progress of technology and on voyages and explorations. It serialized some novels, including Eliza Orzeszkowa's Nad Niemnem, Władysław Reymont's Chłopi Stefan Żeromski's Popioły. Texts published in it are still seen as high quality.

The magazine history ends with the German invasion of Poland in September 1939; the last issue was published on 3 September that year.

Among its contributors most prominent were Polish literary figures such as Józef Ignacy Kraszewski, Eliza Orzeszkowa, Bolesław Prus and Nobel Prize winner Henryk Sienkiewicz. Others included: Tadeusz Boy-Żeleński, Władysław Skoczylas, Władysław Sabowski, Jan Zachariasiewicz, Zygmunt Miłkowski, P. Chmielewski, Wojciech Bogusławski, Marian Gawalewicz, Józef Wieniawski.

It is credited with popularizing woodcut illustrations in Poland, publishing works by artists such as Wojciech Gerson, Henryk Pillati, Franciszek Kostrzewski and Juliusz Kossak.
