= Warsaw Rabbinical School =

- Warsaw; Poland

Information
- Type: Jewish day school
- Established: 1826
- Closed: 1860
- Affiliation: Orthodox Judaism

Warsaw Rabbinical School (Warszawska Szkoła Rabinów) was a Junior High School for Jewish male youth established in 1826 on the basis of the ukase of the emperor Nicholas of July 1, 1825 and existed until the school year 1860/1861.

== History ==
The idea of such a school had been proposed in 1818 during Tsar Alexander I's visit to Warsaw. The idea of the minister of education, Stanisław Kostka Potocki, was for a Higher Israelite School (Wyższa Szkoła Izraelska), which would train rabbis and schoolteachers.

In four school years the following subjects were taught: Old Testament, Midrash (commentaries on the Holy Scriptures), Talmud, general history, history of Poland, mathematics, geography, Hebrew, Polish, German and French. The graduates from the School were members of the Jewish intelligentsia related with the assimilation movement.

Only a few graduates dedicated themselves to the profession of rabbi. Supplementary classes were planned for them. Most of the graduates formed Warsaw's progressive Jewish elite: entrepreneurs, merchants, scientists, journalists, artists and patrons of the arts.

The founding committee appointed by the government of Congress Poland consisted of three Poles, including Stefan Witwicki. The rabbinical school was headed by Antoni Eisenbaum from its founding until his death in 1852, then by Jakub Tugendhold until its closure in 1862. Jews and Christians worked as teachers. Some of the chief teachers of the school were Aaron Moses Cylkow, father of the Judæo-Polish preacher of Warsaw, Jacob Cylkow (who translated the Psalms into Polish; Warsaw, 1883), Abraham Buchner (author of "Der Talmud und Seine Nichtigkeit"), and Izaak Kramsztyk. Most classes in the school were taught in Polish.

Altogether about one thousand Jews graduated from the rabbinical school. The school inspired patriotic attitudes. Some students, like Stanislas Hernisz, took part in the November Uprising of 1830–1831.

The Warsaw Rabbinical School was bitterly criticized by the Orthodox Jews’ circles. Throughout Eisenbaum's tenure at the school, rumors abounded that boys attending the school were fed treyf meals and were generally pressed to abandon their religion. It did not help matters that the school inspector was a catholic priest, the Christian Hebraist Luigi Chiarini, a notorious critic of the Talmud. Worse yet, the school's instructor of Hebrew and Bible was Abraham Buchner, like Eisenbaum a radical enlightener, who taught Hebrew using Chiarini's grammar and used Mendelssohn's Biblical commentaries.

== Bibliography ==
- Strzemski, Michał (1983). "Warszawska Szkoła Rabinów (1826–1863) najdziwniejsza w świecie". Miesięcznik Znak. 339–340 (2–3). Kraków: 361–364.
