= Roman Kramsztyk =

Polish painter (1885–1942)

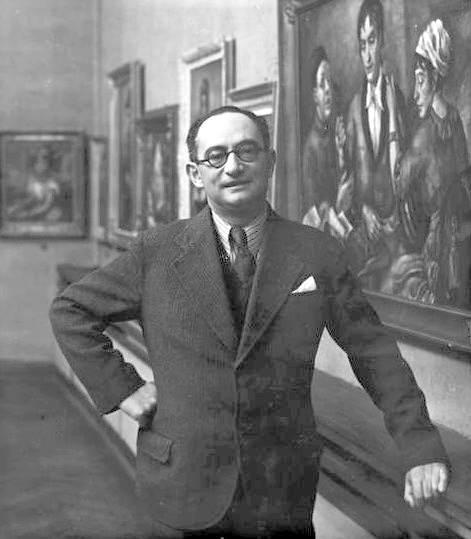
Roman Kramsztyk at the opening of his solo show in Warsaw, November 1932

Roman Kramsztyk (18 August 1885 – 6 August 1942) was a Polish realist painter of Jewish descent in the interwar period. He was shot dead in the Warsaw Ghetto in 1942. His work was also part of the painting event in the art competition at the 1928 Summer Olympics.

== Life ==
Kramsztyk was born in Warsaw as the son of the physician Julian Kramsztyk (1851–1925) and grandson of reform rabbi Izaak Kramsztyk (1814–1899). He studied painting at Kraków Academy of Fine Arts under Józef Mehoffer and in Warsaw at the private art school of Adolf Eduard Herstein, and from 1904 at the Academy of Fine Arts, Munich under Johann Caspar Herterich.

Between 1910 and 1914 he settled in Paris, during the First World War he lived in Warsaw and continued his study of painting with Adolf Eduard Herstein. From 1922 he lived again in Paris, but visited Poland every year. During the 1939 visit he was surprised by the outbreak of World War II and the German occupation of Poland. He was forced to enter the Warsaw Ghetto. He was shot dead 1942 on a ghetto street by a German soldier.

Kramsztyk's painting was influenced by the art of Paul Cézanne. He created portraits, nudes, still life and genre paintings. During his sojourn in the ghetto he created drawings showing the life of imprisoned Jews. Some of these drawings survived the war as documents of the Holocaust horror.

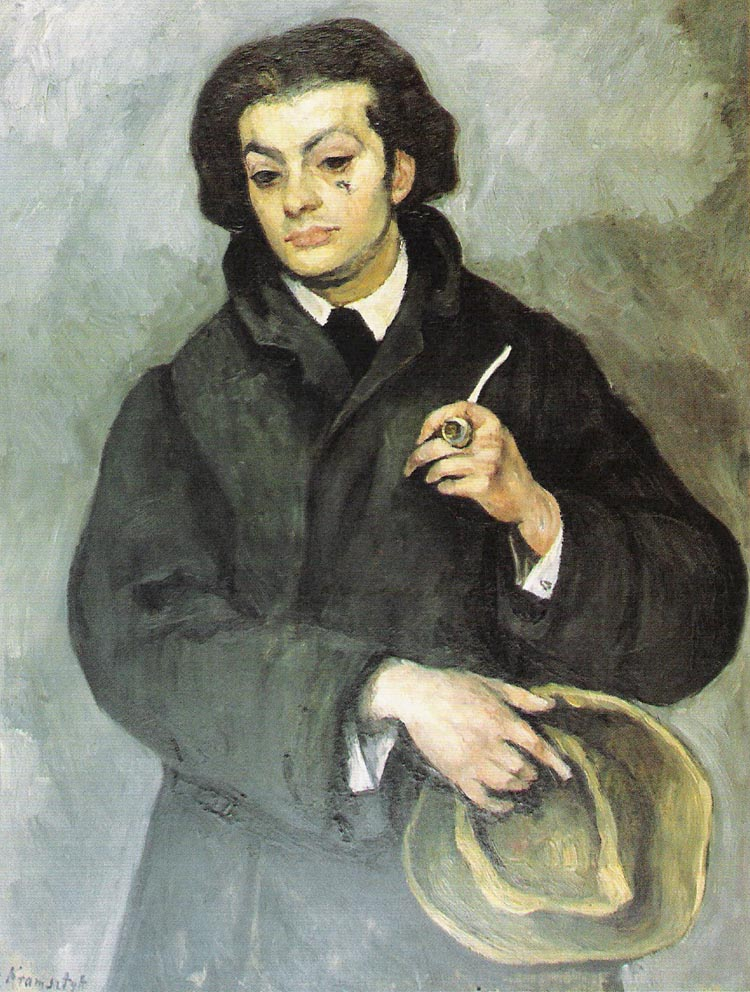
Portrait of Moïse Kisling, 1913

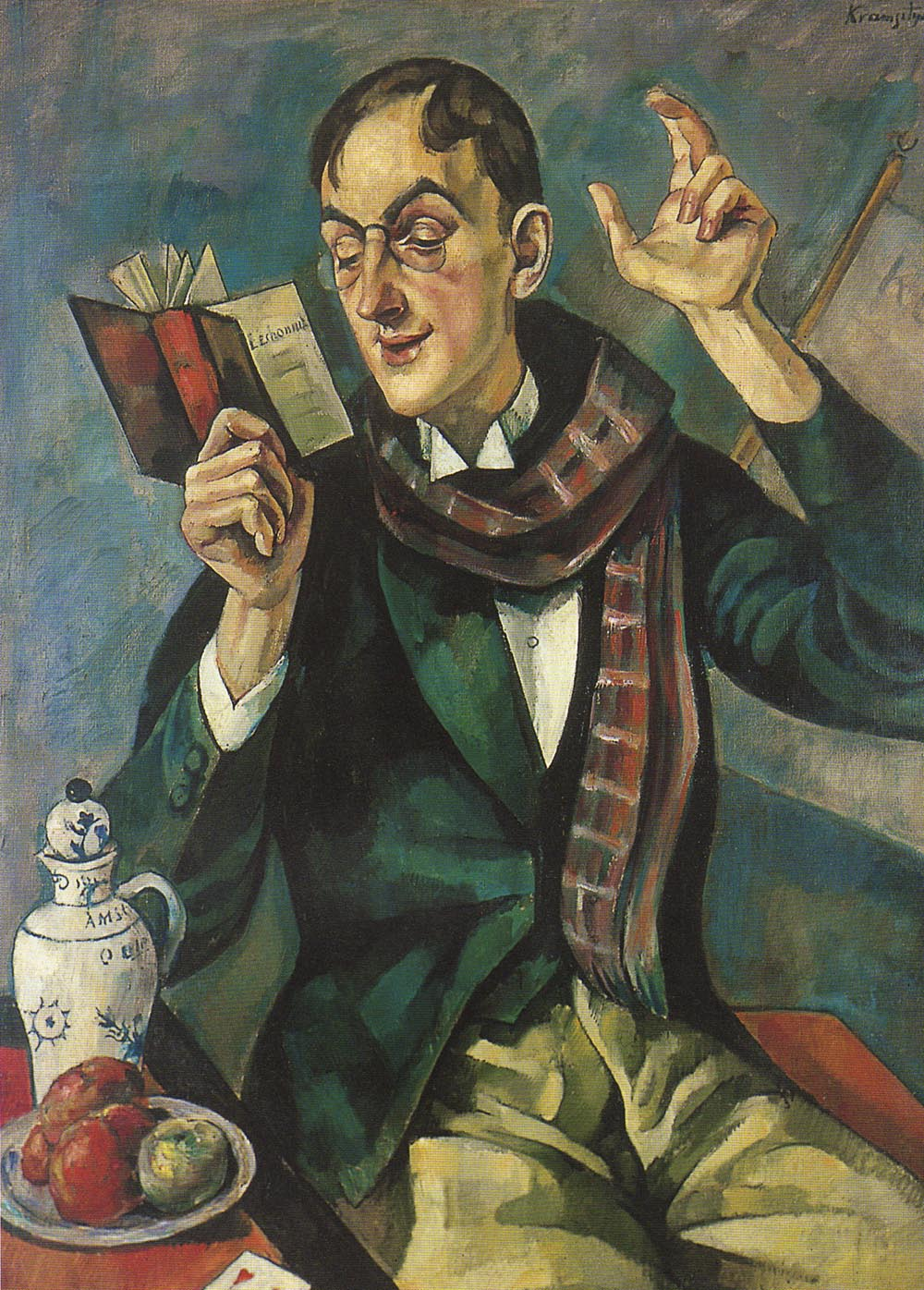
Portrait of Jan Lechoń, 1919

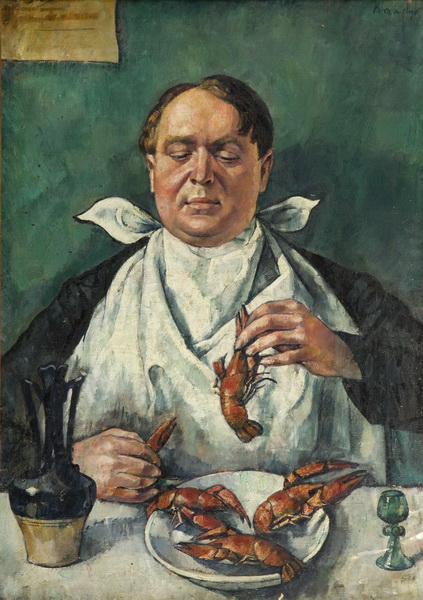
Portrait of Karol Szuster, 1927

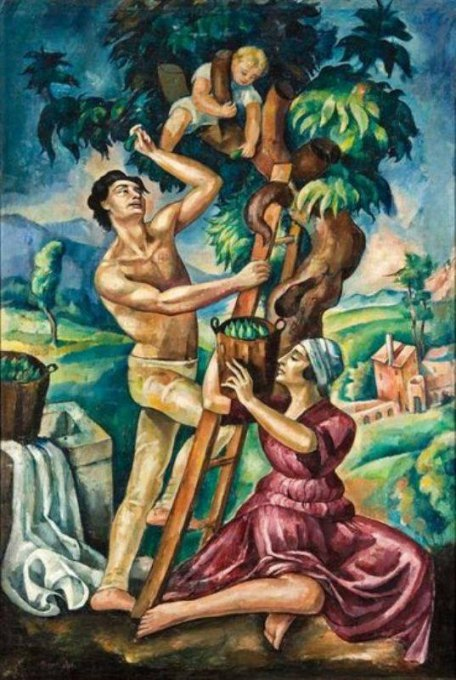
Fig-tree harvest, 1921

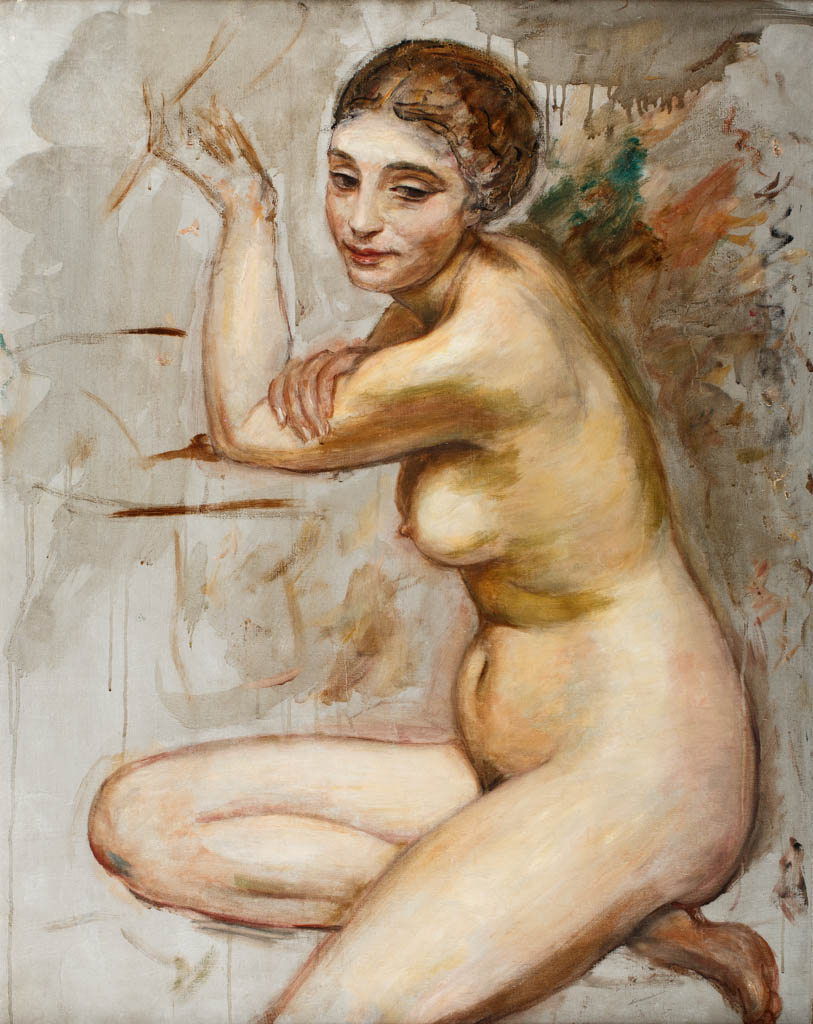
Female nude
