= Izaak Kramsztyk =

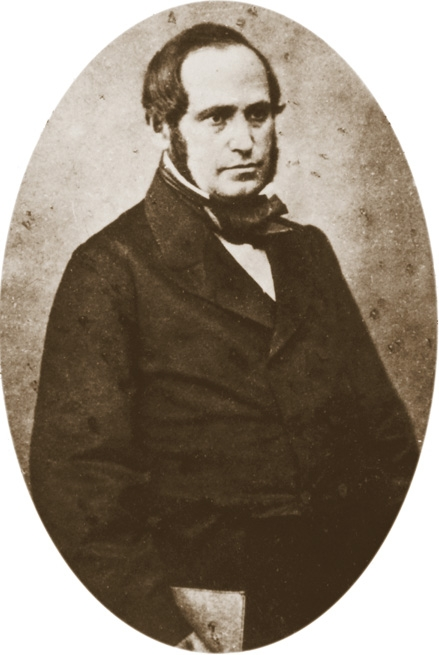
Izaak Kramsztyk

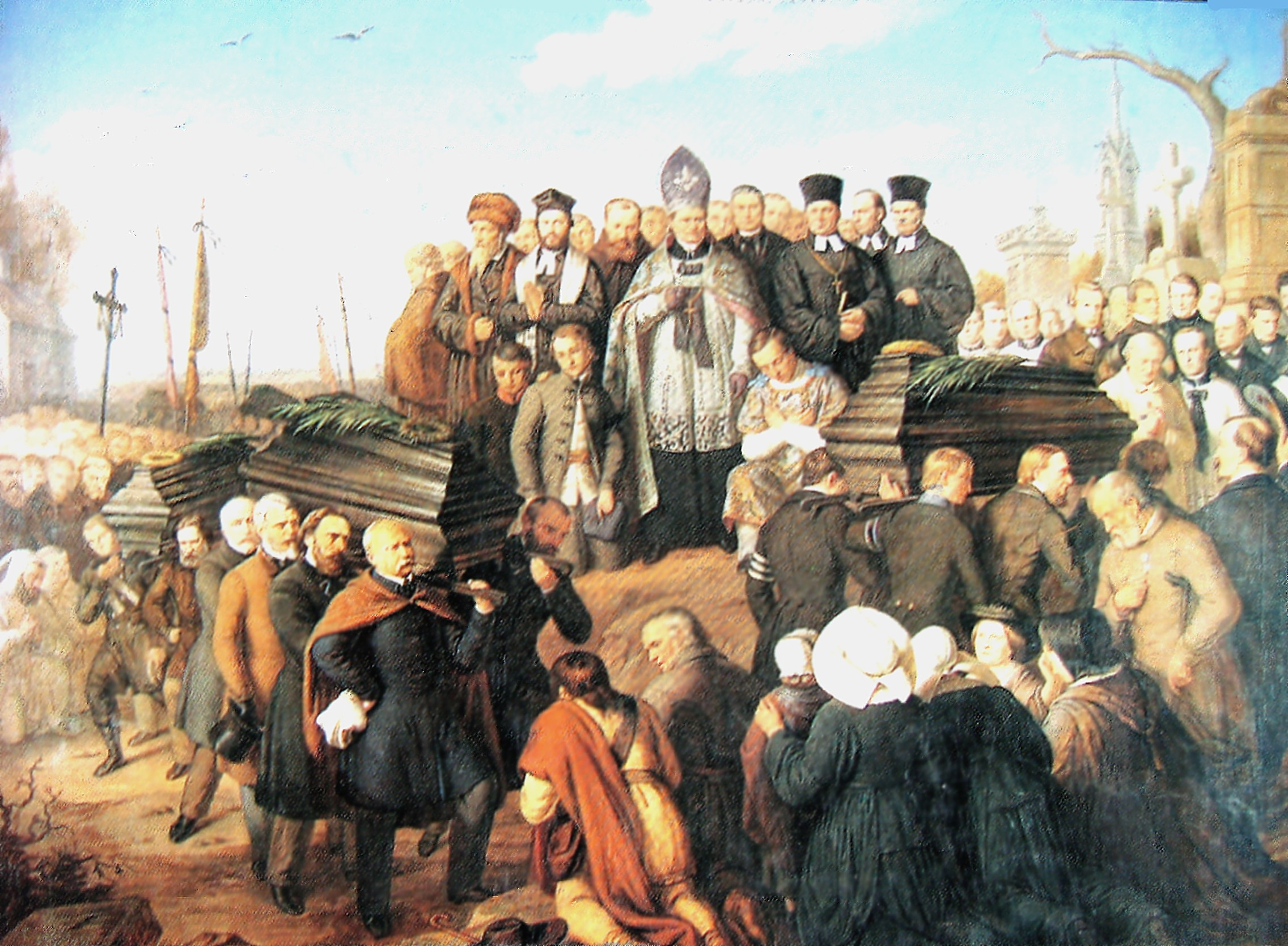
Funeral of the Five Fallen by Aleksander Lesser. Izaak Kramsztyk is standing to the right of the Catholic bishop in the central part of the painting

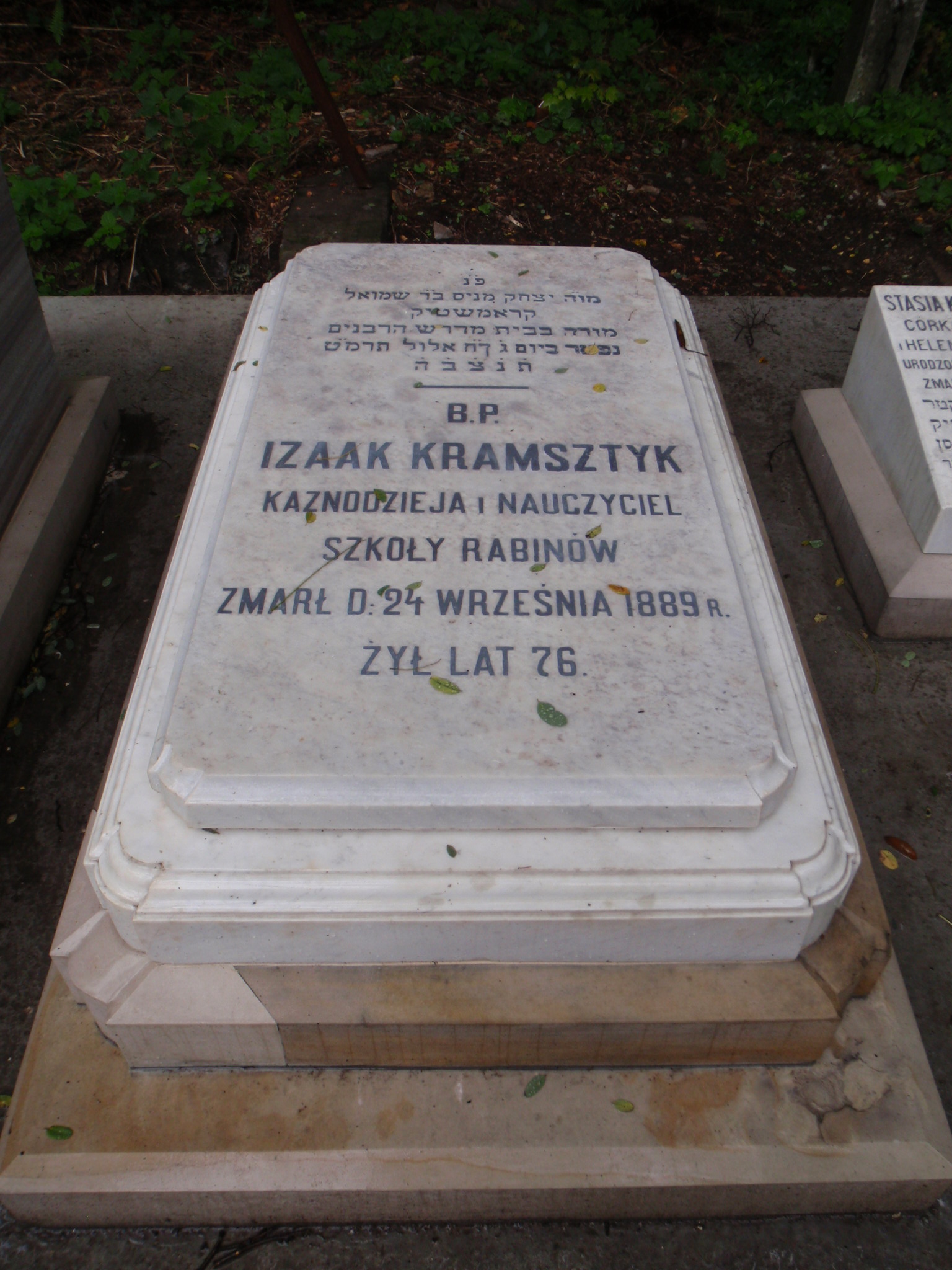
Kramsztyk's grave marker

Izaak Kramsztyk (1814–1889) was a Reform Jewish rabbi, preacher, lawyer and writer. He is credited as the first rabbinic teacher of Talmud in Polish. He started a dynasty of Warsaw's benefactors, scientists and writers, which included his sons Zygmunt, Julian, Feliks, Stanisław and his grandson Roman, a renowned painter.

== Biography ==
Izaak Kramsztyk was born in Warsaw sometime in 1814. He graduated from the local Warsaw's School for Rabbis and soon afterwards he became a tutor at his alma mater. A renowned preacher, he was chosen as the first to preach in the newly opened reformist Polish Synagogue in 1852. A supporter of closer ties between Jews and Poles, he also started teaching Talmud in Polish.

In 1861, during the events leading up to January Uprising, Kramsztyk was among the rabbis who showed solidarity with Catholic Poles, protesting against Cossack soldiers desecrating Warsaw's churches. When the Catholic clergy ordered all Warsaw's churches closed in response to Russian brutality, Kramsztyk reacted likewise and closed down all synagogues of Warsaw as well. He was also among the dignitaries attending the funeral of 5 victims of the February 27, 1861 manifestation. The funeral turned into a large patriotic demonstration and Kramsztyk was arrested by tsarist authorities. Briefly held in Warsaw's Citadel (a notorious prison for political prisoners of the tsarist regime), in the end he was deported from Congress Poland.

Following the outbreak of January Uprising of 1863 Kramsztyk was once again arrested and deported to Siberia. He returned to Warsaw following an amnesty of May 1867. He died there in 1889 and was buried at Okopowa Street Jewish Cemetery.
