= Maria Zandbang =

Polish equestrian

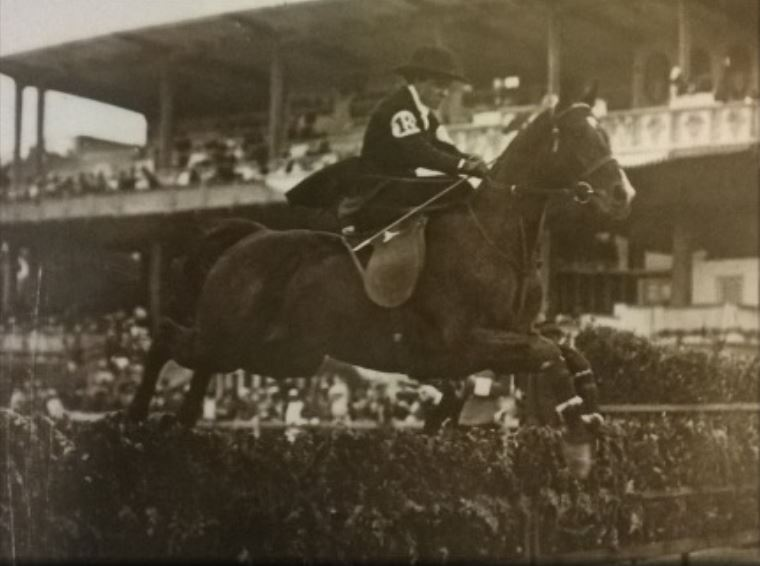
- Zandbang on Zeppelin, 1913
- Born: Maria Aniela Wodzińska; 2 November 1886; Warsaw, Russian Poland
- Died: 30 October 1972 (aged 85); Laski, Polish People's Republic
- Other names: Maria Wodzińska-Zandbangowa, Marja Zandbangowa
- Occupation: competitive equestrian
- Years active: 1911–1930
- Children: 1
- Mother: Maria Kostrzewski-Wodzińska
- Relatives: Franciszek Kostrzewski (grandfather)

Maria Zandbang (2 November 1886 – 30 October 1972) was a Polish equestrian. She and her mother pioneered women's participation in horse riding as a sport in Poland. She held the record in the high jump for women's sidesaddle from 1926 into the 21st century.

== Early life ==
Maria Aniela Wodzińska was born on 2 November 1886 in Warsaw to Maria (née Kostrzewska) and Konrad Wodziński, owners of the Warsaw Riding School. Her father, who had learned to ride while living in France, was the founder of the first private riding school in Warsaw. While her father ran the business side of the school, her mother devoted her time to riding and training. Kostrzewska studied blacksmithing, stock raising, and veterinary science, all unusual for women of her era, to enable her to better care for their horses. In 1890, she became one of the first women to ride astride her horse, which was considered scandalous. She wrote many articles about horses in popular magazines, and published the first book on riding for women, Amazonka – Podręcznik jazdy konnej dla dam. Her mother was known for having pressed the Polish Equestrian Association to expand their regulations to allow competitive women's sidesaddle events.

Wodzińska began riding by the age of four. Her parents first taught her to ride astride and then at age 12, she learned to ride sidesaddle. Initially she participated solely in private competitions organized by her family. In the early years of the 20th century, she married the physician Henryk Zandbang. They had a son, Henryk Franciszek Zandbang (1905–1936), who was killed in an accidental shooting.

== Competitive sports ==
After her marriage, Zandbang began riding in horse shows, with her husband's encouragement. He was also an enthusiast of horses. In 1911, she rode in an event sponsored by the newly created Równieńskie Towarzystwo Wyścigów Konnych (Horse Racing Society of Rivne) taking first place on her mount, Alouette. The success propelled her to ride internationally and she participated in events in Berlin, Lviv, Sopot and Vienna, among other places. In 1913, she participated in the women's competition in Vienna taking the first prize among 40 women, for sidesaddle jumping on Zeppelin, a horse belonging to Tadeusz Dachowski. She also took fifth place on her husband's horse Black and White.

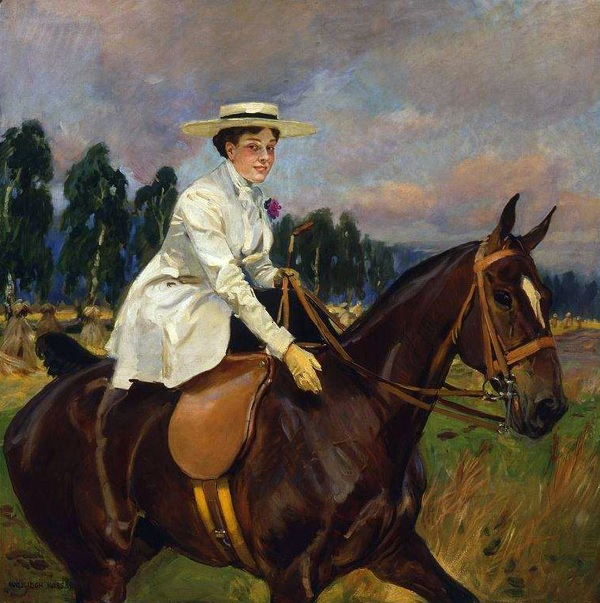
Zandbang by Wojciech Kossak, 1913

In addition to riding, Zandbang was involved in the design of fashion for horse riding. She focused on details that would enhance the appearance of the rider on a horse. Because she was fashionable and a noted beauty, she was painted by numerous artists including Wojciech Kossak, Wacław Pawliszak, and Jan Rosen. She continued to compete internationally until the First World War and then afterwards through the 1920s at the Warsaw Sports Club. In 1926, she set a sidesaddle jumping record, jumping 160 centimetres (5.2 ft) during a competition at the indoor Józef Piłsudski Cavalry Regimental riding hall. In 1935, she was awarded the Honorary Equestrian Badge of the Polish Equestrian Association, for her contributions to the sport.

== Later life and legacy ==
Her husband Henryk was killed during the Warsaw Uprising in 1944 and Zandbang was imprisoned in Ravensbrück concentration camp. After being liberated from the camp in 1946, she returned to Poland and settled in Laski, where she worked as a secretary in the office of the school for the blind. She lived in resident housing on the school grounds until her death on 30 October 1972. She was buried at the cemetery of the Blind People's Institute in Laski. Her jump record stood into the 21st century and an annual competition has taken place in Warsaw, since 2010, hosted by the Museum of Hunting and Riding to try to break her record.
