= Adolf Eduard Herstein =

Polish painter and engraver

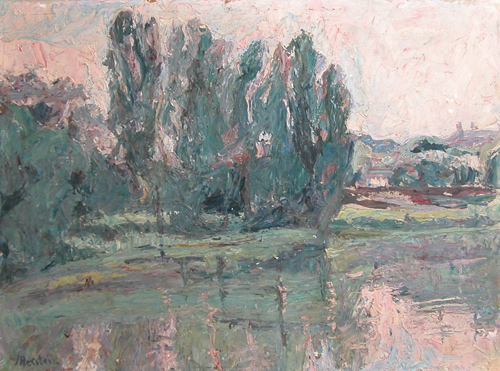
Landscape

Adolf Eduard Herstein (1869–1932) was a Polish painter and engraver.

== Early life and career ==
Born in Warsaw, he worked and taught in France, Germany (where he was active in the Berlin Secession movement) and his native Poland. His oil painting relied on the use of heavy impasto and was in style closely related to Impressionism.

== Personal life ==
In Munich in 1894 he embarked upon an affair with Franziska, Gräfin (i.e., Countess) zu Reventlow (Fanny zu Reventlow). She was pregnant with Herstein's child when in 1895 she married the politician Walter Lübke. The pregnancy ended in a miscarriage.

== Works ==
An engraving of his called 'The Standard Bearer', is in the Museum of Modern Art (MOMA), New York collection. There are two works from the years 1914- 1915 held by the Brooklyn Museum, New York.

In the years 1904–1911 he was the owner of a private school of painting in Warsaw. One of his pupils was Roman Kramsztyk.

== Death ==
Herstein died in Berlin.
