= Jewish City Guard =

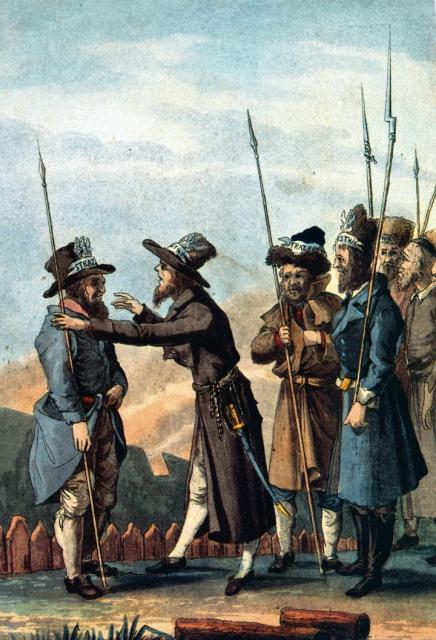
Jewish Security Guard, an 1831 engraving by Fryderyk Krzysztof Dietrich

Jewish City Guard (Polish: Gwardia Miejska Starozakonna) was a paramilitary militia force in Poland during the November Uprising. On 20 December 1830 the representatives of the Polish Jews demanded that their community be allowed to join the Polish Army along with followers of other denominations. The government agreed and Jews were allowed to join all sorts of military formations, including the Polish Army, Security Guard paramilitary organisation and the National Guard.

However, soldiers and officers of all Polish forces were expected to shave their beards when in uniform, while Orthodox Jews argued that "shaving beards adds neither love for one's country nor bravery". To allow them to serve in the armed forces in accordance with their faith, on 28 February 1831 Jewish City Guards were created in each voivodeship capital. By August 1831 the Warsaw Jewish City Guard had 1098 soldiers. The unit took part in the Battle of Warsaw of 1831.
