= Henryk Pillati =

Polish illustrator, caricaturist and history painter

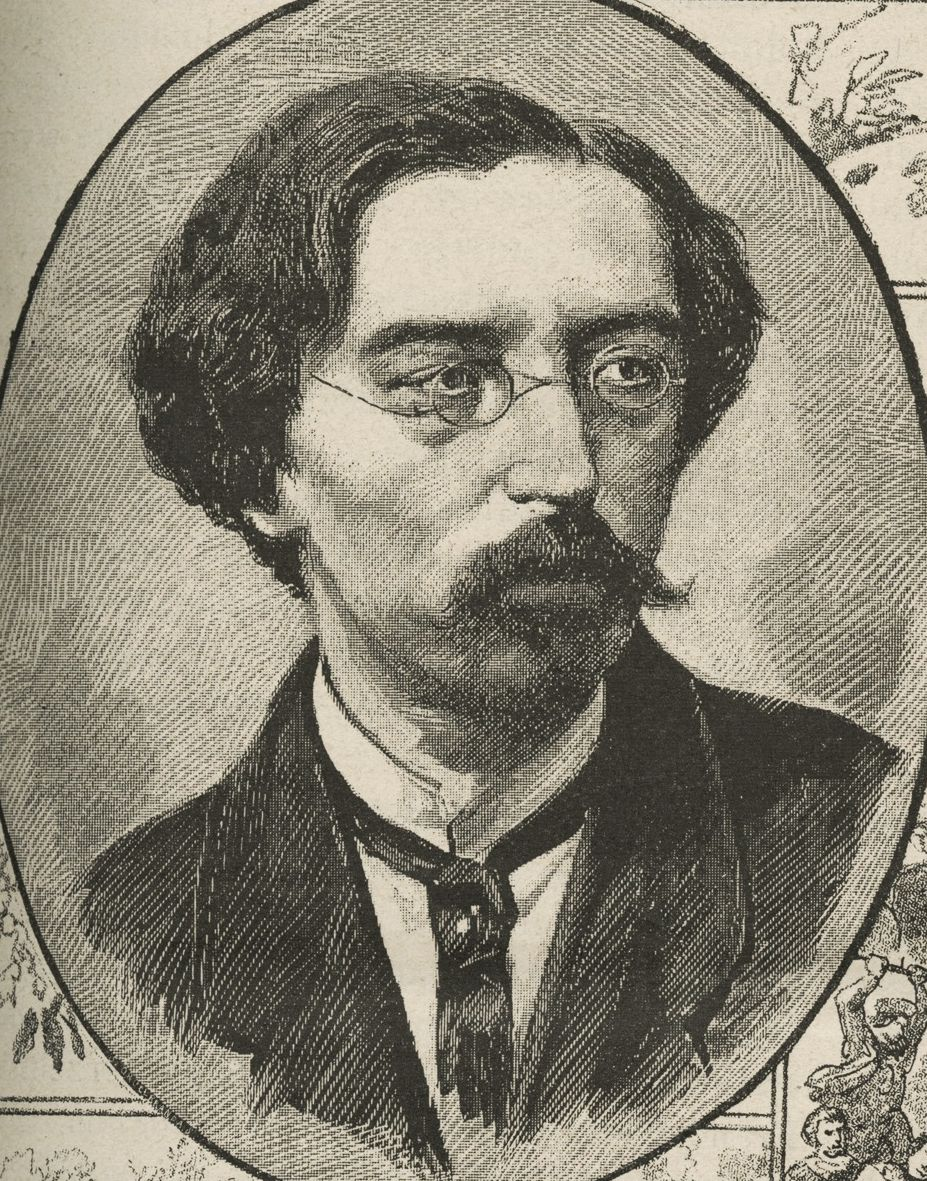
Self-portrait, from Tygodnik Illustrowany (1889)

Henryk Pillati (19 January 1832 – 16 April 1894) was a Polish illustrator, caricaturist and history painter, in the Classical style.

== Biography ==
He was born to a wealthy family. In 1845, at age thirteen, he entered the School of Fine Arts in Warsaw. Three years later, both of his parents died during a cholera epidemic. This forced him to leave school and find work to support his surviving younger siblings.

He managed to get by selling small paintings of genre scenes and episodes from the Polish-Swedish wars. From 1852 to 1853, he created a series of large canvases, designed for decorating steamships owned by Count Andrzej Artur Zamoyski, on the Vistula River. The ships were later confiscated by the Russians during the January Uprising.

Later, he received private scholarships that enabled him to spend a year studying at the École des Beaux-Arts in Paris. Four years later, he continued his studies at the Academy of Fine Arts, Munich, then spent some time in Rome.

After 1860, although he continued to paint historical scenes, he was primarily engaged in providing illustrations for books (notably works by Adam Mickiewicz and Józef Ignacy Kraszewski) and several periodicals in Warsaw, including the Tygodnik Illustrowany, Kłosy (Ears), Wędrowiec (The Wanderer) and Biesiada Literacka (Literary Feast).

In 1879, he moved to Saint Petersburg to work for a publishing house, but his increasing alcoholism ruined his health to the point that his younger brother, Ksawery, who was also a painter, had to bring him home, where he spent his final years living in the residence of the Warsaw Charitable Society. His life was later given fictional treatment in the novel Malaria by Wiktor Gomulicki.

== Selected paintings ==
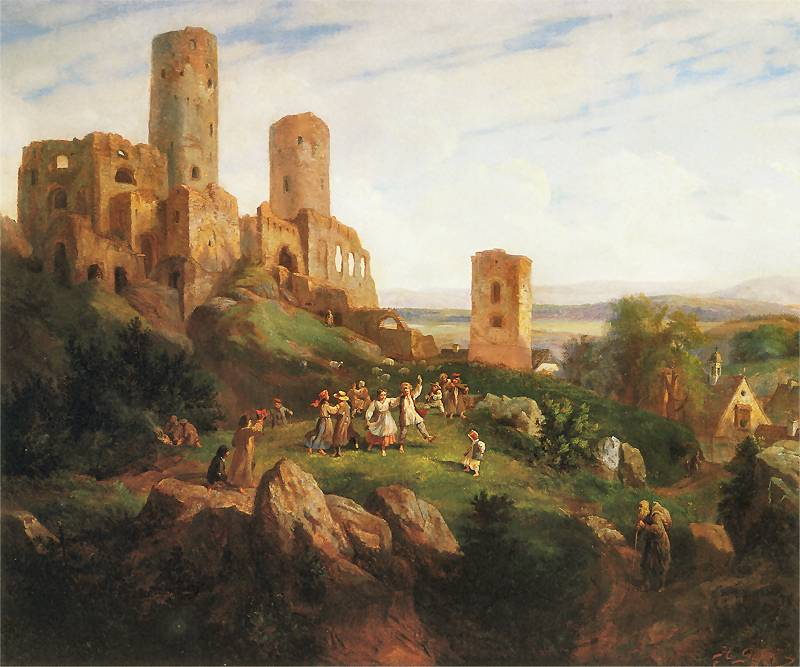
Having Fun in Tenczynek

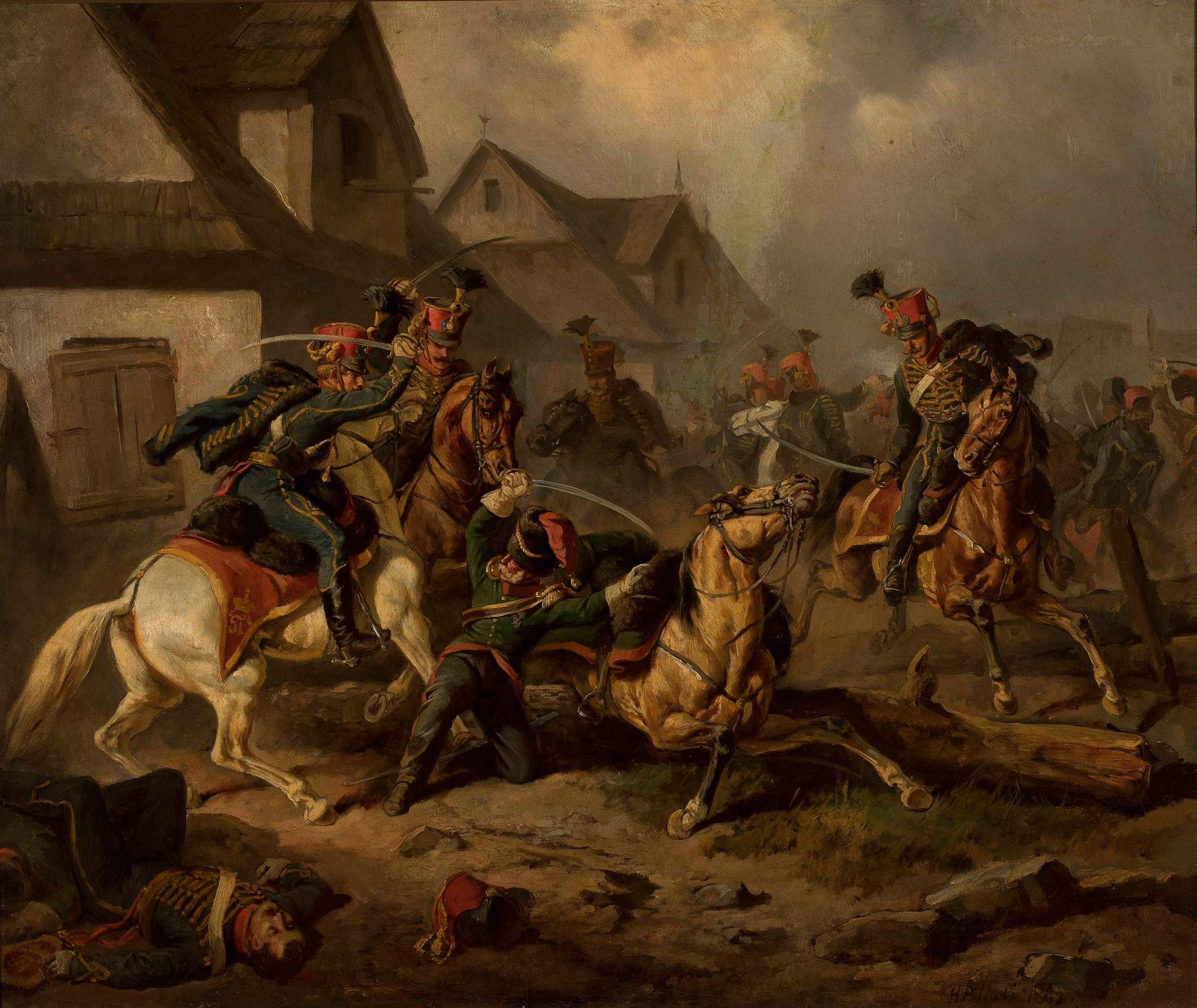
The Death of
Berek Joselewicz

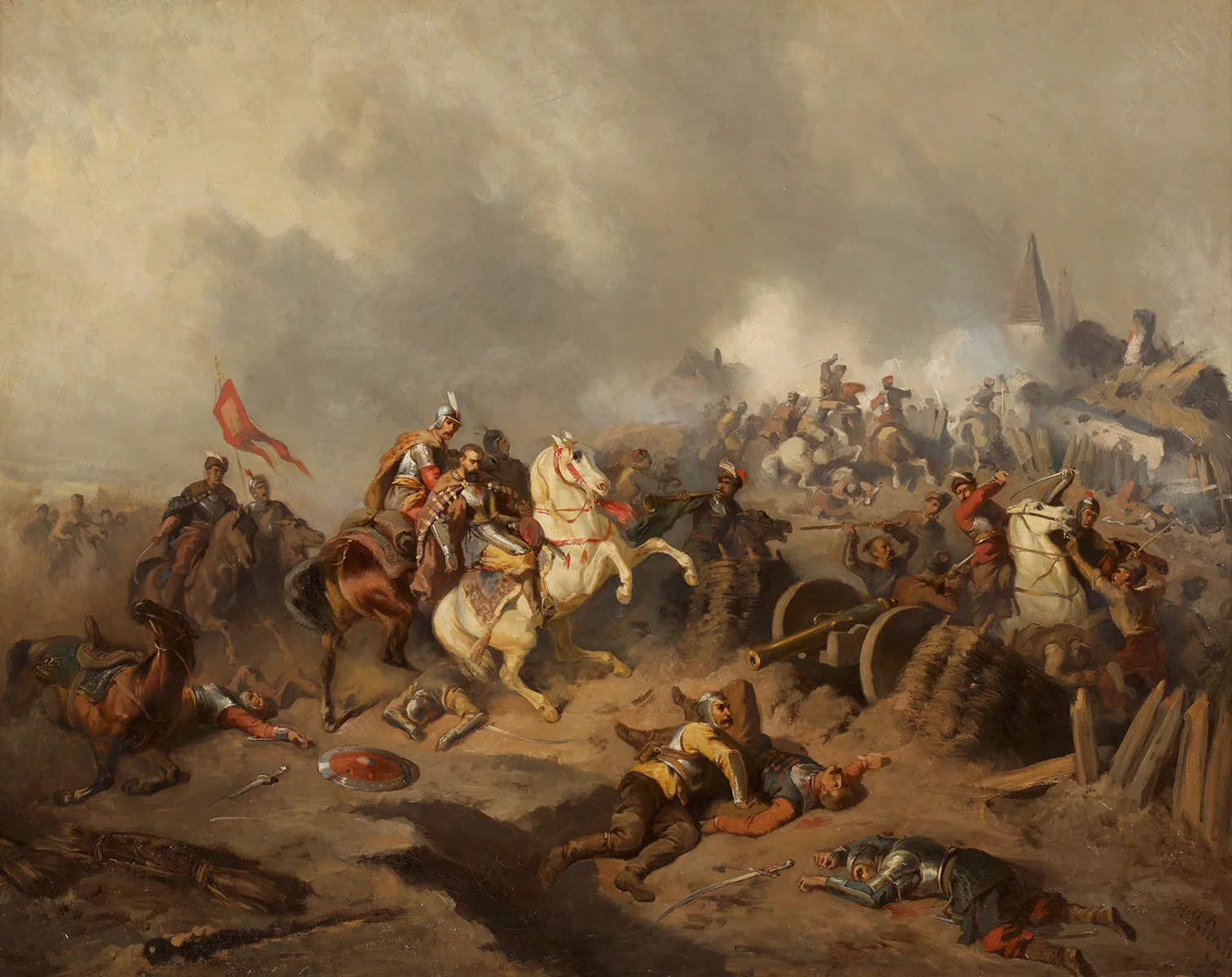
Stefan Czarniecki at Monastyryska

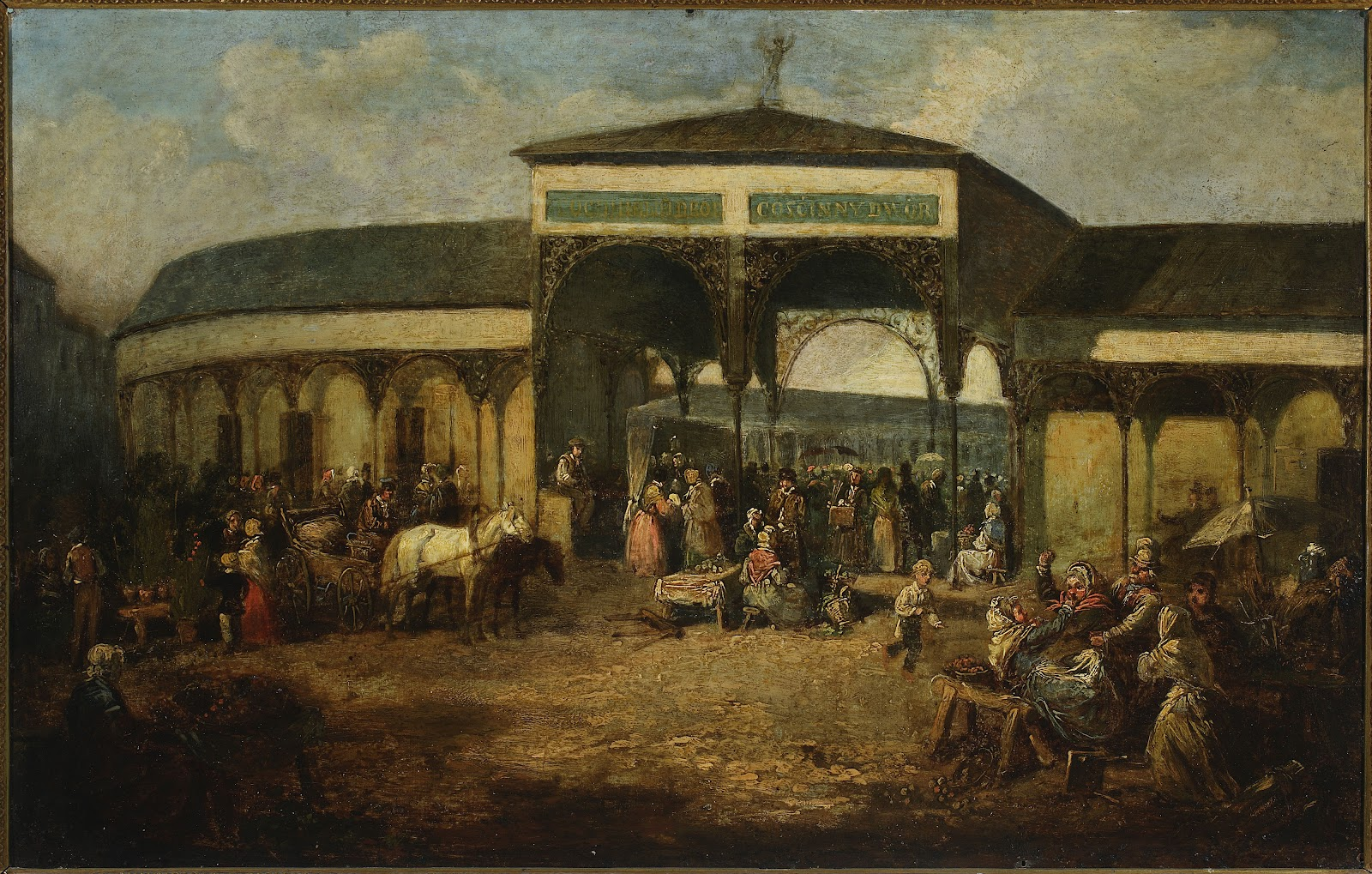
Iron-Gate Square
