= Battle of Kock (1920) =

1920 battle that was part of the Battle of Warsaw

- Part of Polish–Soviet War; Battle of Warsaw
Date	14–16 August 1920
Location	near Kock, Poland 51°39′N 22°27′E
Result	Polish victory

Belligerents
Russian SFSR	Poland

Commanders and leaders
Tikhon Khvesin	Andrzej Galica

Units involved
170th Rifle Brigade of the 57th Rifle Division	21st Mountain Infantry Division

Strength
6,800 bayonets, 1,200 sabres, 45 guns	Unknown

Casualties and losses
Unknown; 198 taken POW	4 killed 46 wounded

The Battle of Kock was fought between 14 and 16 August 1920 in the vicinity of the town of Kock in east-central Poland. The town was to serve as a bridgehead across the Wieprz river for Gen. Józef Piłsudski's counter-offensive against the Russian forces storming Warsaw. However, on 14 August it was captured by forces of the Russian Mozyr Group and the Poles withdrew across the river. In the early morning of 16 August the 21st Mountain Division counter-attacked and retook the town.

The battle, while minor, was one of the last skirmishes of the Polish retreat from Belarus that had started in the early summer – and the first of the Wieprz Counter-offensive, the flanking manoeuvre that gave Poland victory in the Warsaw Operation, better known as the Battle of Warsaw.

== Background ==
Following the failure of the Kiev offensive, the Polish armies retreated westwards from Central Belarus and Ukraine. Although the Bolshevik forces failed to surround or destroy the bulk of the Polish Army, most Polish units were in dire need of fresh reinforcements. The Polish command hoped to halt the advancing Russian forces in front of Warsaw, the capital of Poland. At the same time the Polish Commander-in-Chief, General (later Marshal of Poland) Józef Piłsudski, was to personally lead a flanking manoeuvre with the reinforced 4th Army from the area of the Wieprz River, while General Władysław Sikorski's 5th Army was to leave the Modlin Fortress and head north-east, to cut off the Soviet forces heading westwards, to the north of the bend of the Vistula and Bugonarew, and on towards Pomerania.

The forces of the Polish Fourth Army had been engaged in combat with the Russian 16th Army and the Mozyr Group since the bitter fights in central Belarus in the spring and early summer of 1920. On 6 August 1920 it broke away from the enemy and started its rapid fall-back to the Siedlce-Łuków-Kock line for reorganisation. There it was reorganised with reinforcements from the corps-sized Polesie Group and freshly trained forces from behind the front. The reorganisation was partially completed by 10 August. Then the forces of the army started a flank march to the final positions behind the Wieprz river, with the town of Kock serving as a pivot. That boundary line was reached on 12 August, with the 21st Mountain Division holding the town of Kock itself, as well as several villages in the vicinity.

== Prelude ==
The Polish 21st Mountain Infantry Division was composed in large part of Podhale Rifles, that is recruits of Podhale region in southern Poland. The division included 11 battalions of infantry, 2 cavalry squadrons, 3 batteries of mountain infantry, 4 batteries of field artillery, one heavy artillery battery of 4 guns and a company of sappers. Although highly motivated, the unit was ill-equipped. In addition to logistical problems resulting from the fact that Polish Army's rifles and artillery pieces were produced in at least six countries, each of them using different ammunition, the soldiers of the 21st lacked even the most basic equipment. Piłsudski remarked, that when reviewing the division's troops at Firlej, "almost half of the soldiers paraded in front of me barefoot". The situation of the 21st was made worse by the lengthy withdrawal from Belarus, which also took a heavy toll on the unit's morale.

The Russian 170th Rifle Brigade was composed of 508th and 510th Rifle Regiments as well as a single battery of field artillery. It was directly controlled by the Mozyr Group's commanding officer, Tikhon Khvesin. However, in the course of the Russian summer offensive towards Warsaw, the entire corps-sized Mozyr Group got over-extended along a front of over 200 kilometres (120 mi). Because of that it could offer only limited support to its three divisions. Group's headquarters was located in the Brest Fortress, 123 kilometres (76 mi) from Kock, while 57th Rifle Division's sub-units were occupying a large area, with the frontage stretching roughly 80 kilometres (50 mi) from Maciejowice through Ryki to Kock.

== Battle ==
=== 14 August ===
The Russian 170th Brigade was the only Russian force to enter contact with the Polish 4th Army now positioned behind Wieprz river. Its orders were to cross the river at Kock, seize the Kamionka-Lubartów area and through Michów seize the strategically important town of Dęblin and its 19th-century fortress. The brigade was supported by numerous smaller detachments of infantry and cavalry, as well as the 58th Rifle Division advancing on its flank towards Łęczna and Piaski. The previous day it offered a feeble attempt at crossing the Wieprz river near Kock, but was beaten off. However, for unknown reasons the Poles abandoned the trenches surrounding the Kock bridgehead.

In the early hours of 14 August the Russians mounted yet another assault, this time aimed directly at Kock. Although the pressure of the enemy was small, the Poles withdrew to Wola Skromowska on the other side of the river, 3 kilometres (1.9 mi) to the south, after only a brief exchange of fire. A wooden bridge across the river was destroyed by Polish engineers.

=== 15 August ===
Commanding officer of the Polish Fourth Army Gen. Leonard Skierski immediately ordered the 21st Division to retake Kock. In order for the division to take part in the counter-offensive scheduled for early morning (2:00 am) of the following day, the town had to be retaken in the evening of 15 August. However, a Polish attack on that day stalled. It was discovered that the northern bank of the river was by then under firm control of the Russians, who brought up fresh reinforcements and security detachments to hold the bridgehead and a direct assault was not an option any more. Polish forces on the left flank were more successful and captured the village of Ruska Wieś, overlooking the river on its northern bank. This allowed for two battalions of infantry to ford the river there. Later that night additional two battalions crossed the river virtually unopposed at Sułoszyn on the right flank. Although the town was not retaken in time, this manoeuvre allowed the Poles to occupy convenient positions on both flanks of the enemy. One of the battalions from the right flank group was then dispatched by way of Tarkawica to Borki, 11 kilometres (6.8 mi) behind enemy lines, directly to the north of Kock and along the road from Kock to Radzyń Podlaski. The role of the battalion was to screen against enemy reinforcements from Radzyń and prevent the withdrawal of enemy forces from Kock.

=== 16 August ===
Shortly before daybreak, the 4th Army started its counter-offensive against Russian left flank. Contrary to Polish expectations, the Mozyr Group offered next to no resistance. The only division initially in contact with the enemy was the 21st. Its task was to retake the bridgehead it had lost on 14 August. From there it was to proceed due north, screening the main force from the direction of Radzyń Podlaski and by the end of the day achieve the Ulan-Tuchowicz line. The following day it was to proceed towards Łuków. For this task the 21st Division was provided with a limited aerial reconnaissance. The 21st Division's headquarters and reserves consisting of a single battalion with a section of mounted scouts and a battery of heavy artillery was at Wólka Rozwadowska, all the remaining forces were dispatched for the front.

The assault of Russian positions started before daybreak on 16 August. At 4:45 the Polish battalion which had been advancing along the Ruska Wieś – Kock road entered the town. However, this alerted the defenders who managed to occupy a tactically convenient high ground on the northern outskirts of the town. After a short fight, the Polish battalion was pushed back west of the town with heavy losses. Soon it was joined by another Polish battalion from the 1st Mountain Brigade. A heated skirmish ensued and the enemy pursuit was stopped.

With the Russians preoccupied with the fights on their right flank (to the west of Kock), the commander of the Polish 1st Mountain Brigade ordered his 2nd battalion to ford the river and capture the village of Górka on Russians' left flank. At that point the Russian forces defending Górka were attacked from the front by the 2nd battalion and from the east by the 3rd battalion. After a short struggle the Russians retreated northwards, exposing the left flank of the entire Russian force. With both flanks defeated, the Russian forces broke down and retreated and by 6:30 the town of Kock was occupied by the Poles.

The Russian brigade disintegrated, with its elements withdrawing in two directions: towards north-west in the direction of Serokomla and north towards Radzyń Podlaski. The latter group reached the village of Annówka some 5 kilometres (3.1 mi) from Kock, but were defeated by the battalion from the 2nd Podhale Rifles Regiment after a short pursuit. Forces withdrawing from that skirmish were again intercepted by a battalion of the 4th Podhale Rifles Regiment that had been dispatched towards Borki the previous night. By 9:00 the battle was over.

== Aftermath ==
Although the operation was clearly a success for the Poles, as a result of this fighting the progress of the operation had been delayed almost five hours. The casualties for the entire three-day-long struggle remain unknown. On 16 August alone the Russians lost 198 soldiers taken prisoner of war, in addition to two machine guns and large amount of war materiel captured by the Poles. The Polish 21st Mountain Division also suffered casualties. The action of 16 August cost it four killed and 46 wounded. The remnants of the 170th Brigade of the Red Army shared the fate of the entire Mozyr Group and were defeated in the following days in what became known as the Battle of Warsaw.

== See also ==
- Battle of Radzymin (1920)
- Kock

== Notes ==
The division was originally called the Mountain Division (Polish: Dywizja Górska). On 10 August it was renamed the 21st Infantry Division, in line with other Polish units of the time. See: Rozkaz L. 2014/I Dowódcy Frontu Północno-Wschodniego z 10 sierpnia 1920
Berkewicz (op.cit., p. 12) mentions the village of Tyśmienica, but this is most probably an error as that would mean that the battalion crossed over 80 kilometres (50 mi) overnight, which seems highly unlikely
