= Czerwonka =

Czerwonka may refer to:

- Czerwonka, Łódź Voivodeship (central Poland)
- Czerwonka, Sokółka County in Podlaskie Voivodeship (north-east Poland)
- Czerwonka, Suwałki County in Podlaskie Voivodeship (north-east Poland)
- Czerwonka, Kozienice County in Masovian Voivodeship (east-central Poland)
- Czerwonka, Maków County in Masovian Voivodeship (east-central Poland)
- Czerwonka, Sokołów County in Masovian Voivodeship (east-central Poland)
- Czerwonka, Węgrów County in Masovian Voivodeship (east-central Poland)
- Czerwonka, Koło County in Greater Poland Voivodeship (west-central Poland)
- Czerwonka, Słupca County in Greater Poland Voivodeship (west-central Poland)
- Czerwonka, Ełk County in Warmian-Masurian Voivodeship (north Poland)
- Czerwonka, Olsztyn County in Warmian-Masurian Voivodeship (north Poland)
- Gmina Czerwonka, a rural gmina (administrative district) in Maków County, Masovian Voivodeship
- Czerwonka-Folwark, a village in Węgrów County, Masovian Voivodeship (east-central Poland)
- Czerwonka-Gozdów, a village in Lubartów County, Lublin Voivodeship (east Poland)
- Czerwonka-Parcel, a village in Sochaczew County, Masovian Voivodeship (central Poland)
- Czerwonka Poleśna, a village in Lubartów County, Lublin Voivodeship (east Poland)
- Czerwonka-Wieś, a village in Sochaczew County, Masovian Voivodeship (central Poland)
- Červonka in Latvia

== People with the surname ==
- Drew Czerwonka
- Edyta Czerwonka (born 1985), Polish basketball player
- Natalia Czerwonka (born 1988), Polish long track speed skater
