= Sulki =

Sulki may refer to:

- Sulki, Masovian Voivodeship, Poland
- Sulki, Podlaskie Voivodeship, Poland
- Sulki (name), Korean given name
- Sulki (village), a village name located in District Sargodha, Punjab, Pakistan

== See also ==
- Sulci, city of ancient Sardinia
- Sulky, kind of lightweight cart
