= Battle of Kock =

There were at least four important battles fought in the vicinity of Kock, Poland:

- Battle of Kock (1809) fought during the Napoleonic Wars
- Battle of Kock (1920) fought during the Polish–Soviet War
- Battle of Kock (1939) during the German invasion of Poland
- Battle of Kock (1944) fought during Operation Tempest (World War II)
