= Gmina Ostrówek =

Gmina Ostrówek may refer to either of the following rural administrative districts in Poland:

- Gmina Ostrówek, Lublin Voivodeship
- Gmina Ostrówek, Łódź Voivodeship
