= Lukowiec =

Lukowiec may refer to the following places:

- Łukowiec, Kuyavian-Pomeranian Voivodeship (north-central Poland)
- Łukowiec, Świętokrzyskie Voivodeship (south-central Poland)
- Łukowiec, Masovian Voivodeship (east-central Poland)
- Łukówiec, Mińsk County in Masovian Voivodeship (east-central Poland)
- Łukówiec, Otwock County in Masovian Voivodeship (east-central Poland)
- Łukówiec, Lublin Voivodeship (east Poland)
