= Serock (disambiguation) =

Serock may refer to the following places:

- Serock, Kuyavian-Pomeranian Voivodeship (north-central Poland)
- Serock, Lublin Voivodeship (east Poland)
- Serock in Masovian Voivodeship (east-central Poland)
