= Kunów Lake =

Lake in Lubartów County, Lublin Voivodeship, Poland

Lake Kunów
- Location within Poland
- Location: Lubartów County
- Coordinates: 51°33′N 22°30′E
- Basin countries: Poland
- Settlements: Firlej

Kunów Lake is small lake in Lubartów County in Poland near Lake Firlej.
