= Gmina Firlej =

Gmina Firlej Firlej Commune
- Gmina
- Coat of arms

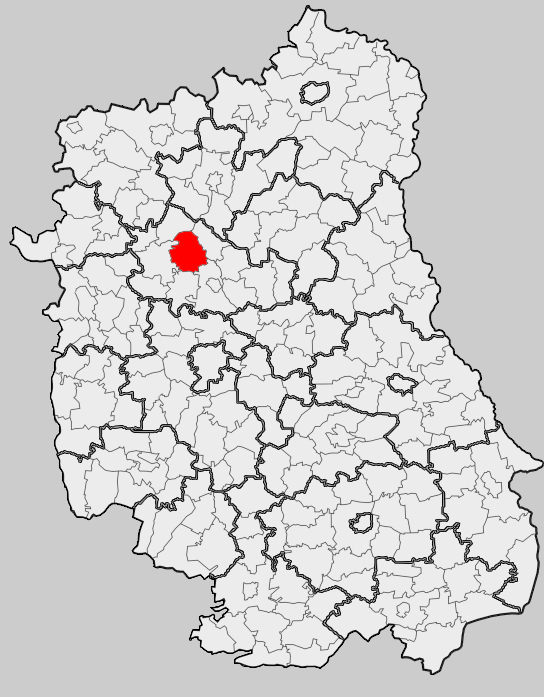
- Location within the county and voivodeship
- Coordinates (Firlej): 51°33′29″N 22°30′29″E
- Country: Poland
- Voivodeship: Lublin
- County: Lubartów
- Seat: Firlej

Area
  - Total: 126.37 km^{2} (48.79 sq mi)

Population (2015)
  - Total: 5,933
  - Density: 46.95/km^{2} (121.6/sq mi)
- Website: http://www.firlej.pl/news.php

Gmina Firlej is a rural gmina (administrative district) in Lubartów County, Lublin Voivodeship, in eastern Poland. Its seat is the village of Firlej, which lies approximately 12 kilometres (7 mi) north-west of Lubartów and 35 km (22 mi) north of the regional capital Lublin.

The gmina covers an area of 126.37 square kilometres (48.8 sq mi), and as of 2006 its total population is 6,173 (5,933 in 2015).

== Neighbouring gminas ==
Gmina Firlej is bordered by the gminas of Kamionka, Kock, Lubartów, Michów and Ostrówek.

== Villages ==
The gmina contains the following villages having sołectwo status: Baran, Bykowszczyzna, Czerwonka Poleśna, Czerwonka-Gozdów, Firlej, Kunów, Łukówiec, Majdan Sobolewski, Nowy Antonin, Pożarów, Przypisówka, Serock, Sobolew, Sobolew-Kolonia, Stary Antonin, Sułoszyn, Wola Skromowska, Wólka Mieczysławska, Wólka Rozwadowska and Zagrody Łukówieckie.

== See also ==
- Firlej Lake
