= Operation Tempest =

1944–1945 anti-Nazi uprising in Poland

- Part of Eastern Front and World War II
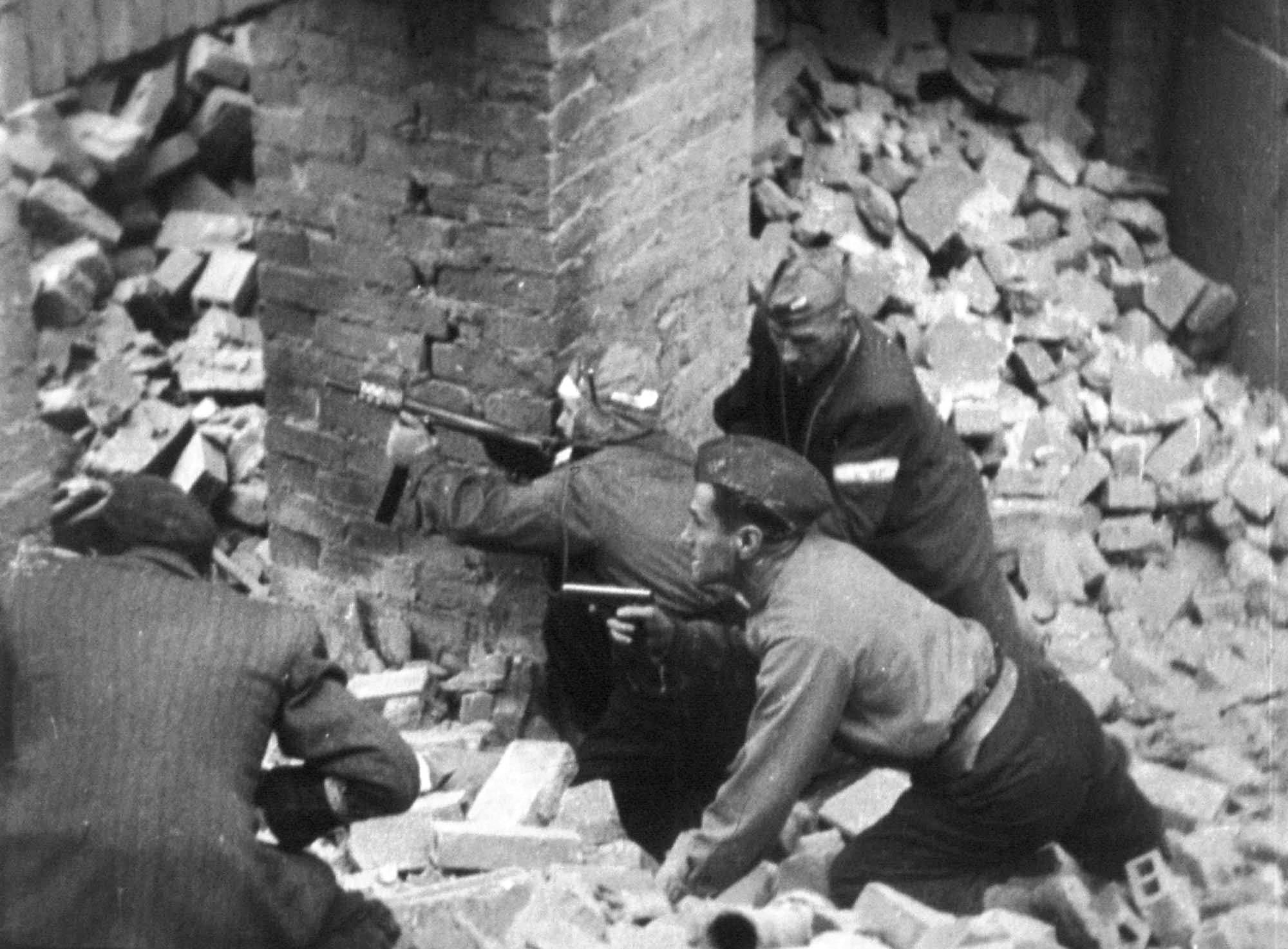
- Polish soldiers during the Warsaw Uprising.
Date	January 4, 1944 – January 1, 1945
Location	Nazi Germany, Poland, General Government
Territorial changes	Most of Poland occupied by the Red Army and their Polish Allies

Belligerents
Germany	Polish Underground State: Home Army

Commanders and leaders
Hans Frank; Erich von dem Bach-Zelewski	Tadeusz Bór-Komorowski; Leopold Okulicki

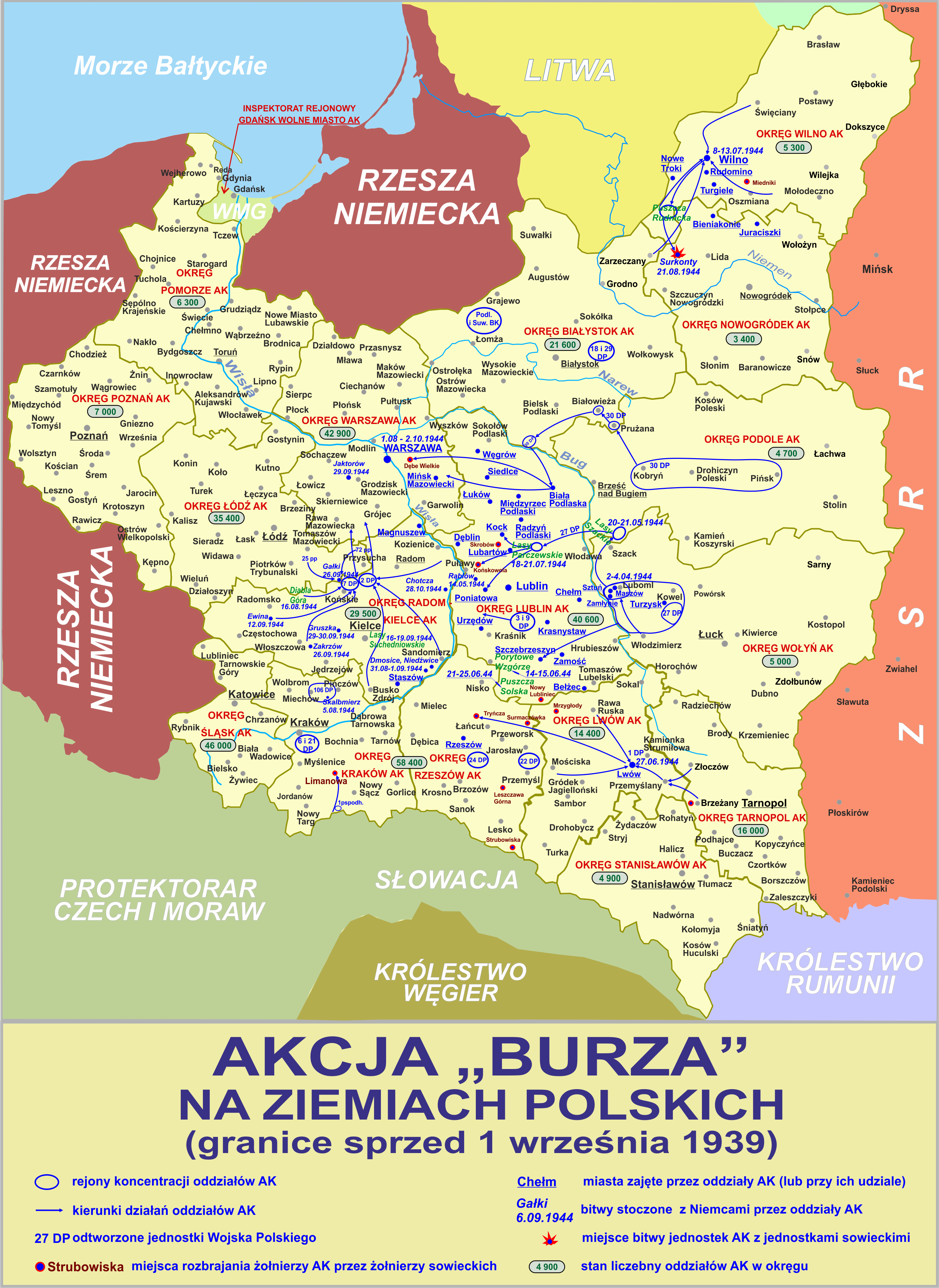

Operation Tempest or Operation Burza (Note: Polish: akcja „Burza”) (Polish: akcja „Burza”, sometimes referred to in English as "Operation Storm") was a series of uprisings conducted during World War II against occupying German forces by the Polish Home Army (Armia Krajowa, abbreviated AK), the dominant force in the Polish resistance.

Operation Tempest's objective was to seize control of German-occupied cities and areas while the Germans were preparing their defenses against the advancing Soviet Red Army. The Polish Underground State hoped to take power before the Soviets arrived.

A goal of the Polish government-in-exile in London was to restore Poland's 1939 borders with the USSR, rejecting the Curzon Line border. According to Jan Ciechanowski,

"The [exiled] Polish Cabinet believed that by refusing to accept the Curzon Line they were defending their country's right to exist as a national entity. They were determined that Russo-Polish relations should be restored on the basis of the pre-1939 territorial arrangements."

== History ==
From its inception, the Home Army had been preparing a national armed uprising against the Germans. The basic framework of the future uprising was created in September 1942. According to the plan, the Uprising was to be ordered by the Polish Commander-in-Chief in exile when the defeat of the Wehrmacht on the Eastern Front became apparent. The Uprising was to begin in Central Poland: in the General Government, Dąbrowa Basin, Kraków Voivodeship, and the Białystok and Brześć areas.

The Uprising's basic objectives were to:

1. end the German occupation;
2. seize arms and supplies needed for a Polish regular army on Polish soil;
3. counter the threat from the Ukrainian Insurgent Army (see Massacres of Poles in Volhynia);
4. rebuild a regular Polish Army;
5. rebuild civil authority, communications, and an arms industry;
6. maintain peace and order behind the front lines; and
7. begin offensive operations against Wehrmacht forces still on Polish soil.

Captain "Mruk" of the Radom–Kielce area Home Army, with a Soviet reconnaissance patrol

Reconstruction of a Polish regular army was to be based on the prewar Polish order of battle. Home Army units were to be turned into regular divisions. Initially to be created were 16 infantry divisions, three cavalry brigades and one motorized brigade, to be equipped with captured weapons or with arms and supplies delivered by the Allies. The second phase was to see the re-building of an additional 15 divisions and 5 cavalry brigades which, before World War II, had been stationed in eastern and western Poland.

The plan was partly implemented. Beginning in 1943, Home Army units were grouped into larger units bearing the names and numbers of prewar Polish divisions, brigades and regiments.

=== "Allies of our allies" ===
In early 1943, after the German defeat at Stalingrad, it became clear that the Soviets would be the force the Home Army would most likely have to deal with, and that the planned Polish uprising would face a still-powerful German army, rather than units retreating to an already defeated homeland.

In February 1943, the Home Army chief, General Stefan Rowecki, amended the plan. The Uprising would take place in three stages. The first stage would be an armed uprising in the east (with main centers of resistance at Lwów and Vilnius) in advance of the approaching Red Army. In preparation, the "Wachlarz" organization was formed. The second stage would be an armed struggle in the zone between the Curzon Line and the Vistula River; and the third stage would be a national uprising throughout the rest of Poland.

On April 25, 1943, Polish-Soviet diplomatic relations were broken off by Joseph Stalin due to Polish inquiries about the Katyn massacres, and it became clear that the advancing Red Army might not come to Poland as a liberator but rather, as General Rowecki put it, "our allies' ally." On November 26, 1943, the Polish government-in-exile issued instructions that, if diplomatic relations did not resume with the Soviet Union before the Soviets entered Poland, Home Army forces were to remain underground pending further decisions.

The Home Army's commander on the ground, however, took a different approach, and on November 30, 1943, a final version of the plan was drafted.

=== Overview of the operation ===
Polish Home Army's 7th Infantry Division, from the Radom–Kielce area, during Operation Tempest

The plan was to cooperate with the advancing Red Army on a tactical level, while Polish civil authorities came out from underground and took power in Allied-controlled Polish territory. This plan was approved by the Delegate of the government-in-exile and by the Polish underground parliament, the Home Political Representation.

On January 2, 1944, Red Army forces of the 2nd Belorussian Front crossed the prewar Polish border and Operation Tempest began. The Division managed to contact the commanders of the advancing Red Army and began successful joint operations against the Wehrmacht. Together they retook Kowel (April 6) and Włodzimierz. However, the Division was soon forced to retreat west, and in Polesia was attacked by both German and Soviet forces. Polish soldiers taken prisoner by the Soviets were given the choice of joining the Red Army or being sent to Soviet forced-labor camps. The remnants of the Division crossed the Bug River, where they were attacked by Soviet partisan units. After liberating the towns of Lubartów and Kock, the Division (reduced to some 3,200 men) was surrounded by the Red Army and taken prisoner.

== In different regions of Poland ==
=== Southeast Volhynia ===
Operation Tempest began in Volhynia, a region which until 1939 had belonged to the Second Polish Republic (see Wołyń Voivodeship (1921–1939)), in January 1944, after the Red Army had entered prewar Polish territory east of the town of Sarny on January 4. The operation, which was mainly carried out by the 27th Home Army Infantry Division (Poland) (some 6500 soldiers) was aimed at the Wehrmacht units, still operating in the region.

- January 4, 1944: the Red Army enters Volhynia east of Sarny
- January 15: a mobilization of ethnic Poles takes place in the area of Kowel and Włodzimierz Wołyński
- January 28: the 27th Volhynian Home Army Infantry Division is officially created
- February 10: Colonel Jan Wojciech Kiwerski is named commandant of the Volhynian District of the Home Army
- March 4: first Home Army unit meets the advancing Red Army
- March 17: a Wehrmacht company is disarmed at the village of Zasmyki near Kowel
- March 18: first skirmishes against Germans take place
- March 20–27: heavy battles in the Turia river valley
- March 23: a German detachment is disarmed at Stezarzyce
- March 24: a skirmish near Kapitulka
- March 26: Colonel Kiwerski meets Soviet General Sergeev
- April 1944: heavy fighting with the Wehrmacht west of Kowel. Due to German superiority, on April 12 Polish forces try to get in touch with the Red Army, after a failed attempt to capture Włodzimierz Wołyński. Eventually, the division is surrounded, and on April 18, its commandant, Colonel Kiwerski, was killed in action. On April 21 the unit escapes the encirclement, and after several skirmishes, on June 10 it crosses the Bug River, entering Lesser Poland. The division then took part in Operation Tempest in the region of Lublin, remaining active until late July 1944.

All together, between January and June 1944, the 27th Volhynian ID of the Home Army took part in over 100 skirmishes, losing over 600 soldiers. German and Hungarian losses are estimated at up to 750 KIA and 900 wounded.

=== Northeast Operation Ostra Brama ===
In the north, on July 7, 1944, the forces of the Wilno and Nowogródek Home Army districts (some 13,000 men under Colonel Aleksander Krzyżanowski) launched an attack on German-occupied Vilnius, although the attack stalled until the arrival of Soviet forces. The AK and Soviet armies then jointly occupied the city on July 13. Prior to the assault, the surrounding countryside had also been seized by Polish and Soviet partisans. Cooperation ended almost immediately after Vilnius was occupied; on July 14, Krzyżanowski and his officers were disarmed and imprisoned, and AK units who resisted disarmament were violently crushed by Soviet forces, with dozens of Polish fatalities.

=== Lwów Uprising ===
On July 23, Home Army forces in Lwów (now Lviv) began an armed rising in cooperation with advancing Soviet forces. In four days the city was taken over. The Polish civil and military authorities were then summoned to "a meeting with Red Army commanders" and taken prisoner by the Soviet NKVD. Colonel Władysław Filipkowski's men were forcibly conscripted into the Red Army, sent to forced-labor camps, or went back underground.

=== Polesie ===
Operation Tempest in Polesia took place in the final days of the German occupation of this region. Due to rapid Soviet advance westwards (see Operation Bagration), it lasted for two weeks (July 15–30, 1944), mainly in the western part of Polesie, near Brześć nad Bugiem, Kobryn and Bereza Kartuska, but also in the area of Pinsk. The Home Army headquarters gave orders for the 30th Home Army Infantry Division to be created in Polesia. This unit was tasked with capturing the areas north and east of Brześć. The division concentrated in forested areas along the Nurzec river, with some 1000 soldiers.

On July 17, a Wehrmacht motorized transport was attacked near the folwark of Adampol, and a skirmish with the Germans took place near the village of Wyzary. On July 30, 1944, Polish forces made contact with Red Army's 65th Army: Soviet officers ordered the Poles to merge with First Polish Army. Poles disobeyed this order, and headed towards Biała Podlaska, where they decided to march to Warsaw and fight in the Warsaw Uprising. Near Otwock, the division was surrounded and disarmed by the Soviets.

=== Warsaw Uprising ===
Polish Home Army's 26th Infantry Regiment en route from the Kielce–Radom area to Warsaw in an attempt to join the Warsaw Uprising

Seeing the fate of the Home Army forces that had taken part in Operation Tempest, the Polish government in exile and the Home Army's current commander, General Tadeusz Bór-Komorowski, decided that the last chance for regaining Poland's independence was to open an uprising in Warsaw. On July 21, 1944, Bór-Komorowski ordered that the Warsaw Uprising begin at 17:00 hours on August 1, 1944. The political goal was to emphasize for the Allies the existence of the Polish government and Polish civil authorities. Warsaw was to be taken in order to allow the legitimate Polish government to return from exile to Poland.

At the same time, other Home Army districts were also mobilized. Units of the Kraków area were preparing an uprising, similar to the one in Wilno, Lwów and Warsaw, but it was cancelled due to several reasons (see: Kraków Uprising (1944)). In the Kielce and Radom area, the 2nd Polish Home Army Division was formed and took control of the entire area except for the cities. Other units were also mustered in Kraków, Łódź and Greater Poland.

=== Białystok ===
Operation Tempest in Białystok and its area began in the second half of July 1944 and lasted until late September. The Home Army recreated here four units, based on interbellum Polish Army: 18th and 29th Infantry Divisions, also Suwałki Cavalry Brigade and Podlaska Cavalry Brigade. All together, some 7,000 soldiers fought in over 200 battles and skirmishes. The operation was commanded by Colonel Władysław Liniarski.

The first unit to enter the fighting was 81st Home Army Infantry Regiment, which operated in the forests around Grodno. Armed with light weapons, the regiment was too weak to capture the city of Grodno and limited its activities to fighting German outposts and police stations.

In the outskirts of Białystok, among Polish forces concentrated in the Knyszyn Wilderness were: 42nd Home Army Infantry Regiment, and 10th Home Army Uhlan Regiment. The 2nd Home Army Uhlan Regiment operated in the area of Bransk and Hajnówka. This unit destroyed the rail line between Hajnówka and Czeremcha, including a rail bridge, which was blown up. The 76th Home Army Infantry Regiment fought in the area of Ciechanowiec and Lapy.

Three Home Army regiments were formed in the Augustów Primeval Forest: 1st Home Army Uhlan Regiment (with 300 soldiers), 41st Home Army Infantry Regiment and 3rd Regiment (all together: 700 soldiers).

Fearing a partisan attack, the Germans declared a state of emergency in the town of Augustów. During Operation Tempest in this part of Białystok Province, over 30 raids of different kinds took place, in which 4 military transports were blown up, along the rail line from Augustow to Grodno. Home Army forces cooperated with the Red Army. On August 6, a unit of 300 soldiers managed to get through German lines, and into the areas controlled by the Soviets. By autumn 1944, most regiments had ceased operations. The last skirmish in this area took place on November 2 near the village of Nowinka.

In the forests surrounding the Osowiec Fortress, 9th Home Army Mounted Rifles were concentrated under Wiktor Konopka. In July and August 1944, this regiment fought the Germans in several locations. On September 8, after a heavy battle, the unit was destroyed by the enemy. Survivors managed to cross the frontline, which at that time was along the Biebrza river.

In the area of Łomża, the 33rd Home Army Infantry Regiment was created, with three battalions. It fought rear German units, breaking communication links between frontline and East Prussia. Near the village of Czarnowo-Undy, some 150 Soviet prisoners of war were released by the Poles. As a reprisal, the Germans burned the village, shooting all its residents (July 22, 1944). On August 20, the 5th Home Army Uhlan Regiment, which operated in the area of Ostrołęka, attacked a German artillery battery near the village of Labedy.

=== Lublin ===
Operation Tempest in the area of Lublin took place in the final two weeks of July 1944. The Home Army created there such units, as 3rd Infantry Division, 9th Infantry Division, 15th Infantry Regiment, also units of Bataliony Chłopskie and other resistance organizations, plus 27th Home Army Infantry Division (Poland) from the province of Volhynia. All together, Polish forces in the region had some 20,000 men.

The partisans attacked retreating German forces along railways and roads in the whole district of Lublin. In several cases, they defended villages pacified by the Wehrmacht and the SS. Poles cooperated with Red Army guerillas, which also operated in the area.

In the south (the region of Zamość), 9th Infantry Regiment under Major Stanislaw Prus liberated the town of Bełżec (July 21). Together with the Soviets, they captured Tomaszów Lubelski. German forces were attacked in several locations, including Frampol and Zwierzyniec.

On July 21 and 22, Volhynian 27th Division captured Kock, Lubartów and Firlej. In western part of the province, 8th and 15th Infantry Regiments liberated a number of towns: Kurów, Urzędów, Nałęczów, Garbów, Wąwolnica, Sobolew, Ryki, Końskowola. On July 26, Polish units cooperated with Soviet forces fighting for Puławy. Several German rail transports were destroyed, and Polish soldiers saved Końskowola from Germans, who planned to set the town on fire.

=== Kraków ===
Home Army District of Kraków was one of the largest districts of the organization. It spread from Przemyśl to Kraków itself, and the first fighting in the area took place in the east. In Rzeszów and Przemyśl, 22nd and 24th Home Army Divisions were mobilized. In Rzeszów, Mielec and Krosno, 10th Home Army Cavalry Brigade was created. In the west, 6th and 106th Home Army Infantry Divisions were created, also Kraków Brigade of Motorized Cavalry. Other units active in the region were: Independent Battalion of Major Jan Panczakiewicz and Operational Group Kraków under Colonel Edward Godlewski.

The Home Army considered an armed insurrection in the city of Kraków, but this plan was abandoned (see Kraków Uprising (1944)).

=== Radom–Kielce ===
Operation Tempest in Radom and Kielce began on August 1, 1944, and lasted until October 6. The Home Army here created 2nd, 7th and 28th Infantry Divisions, with several other units. The purpose of the operation was to aid the Red Army with its capture of the eastern bank of the Vistula and cities of the region. Polish partisans planned to defend the Vistula bridges, and armament factories in Starachowice and Skarżysko-Kamienna.

After the Red Army had managed to cross the Vistula and capture bridgeheads at Sandomierz and Magnuszew (see Lublin–Brest Offensive), Home Army got in touch with the Soviets, and began cooperating with them.

In Kozienice and Sandomierz, Polish units supported the advancing Soviets: on the night of July 31 / August 1, 1944, a German counterattack was halted by the Polish 2nd Infantry Regiment of Captain Michal Mandziara, which helped the Soviets keep their positions in the Sandomierz Bridgehead. On August 3, Polish and Soviet forces liberated Staszów; in the following days, Poles, helped by Soviet tanks, captured Stopnica and Busko.

On August 14, 1944, General Tadeusz Bór-Komorowski ordered all units of the Kielce – Radom area to march towards Warsaw and join the Warsaw Uprising. Operation Revenge, as it was called, resulted in the creation of Kielce Corps of the Home Army, under Colonel Jan Zientarski, with 6,430 soldiers. On August 21, during its concentration, the Corps saved residents of the village of Antoniów, which was raided by Germans.

Even though Kielce Corps began its march towards Warsaw, it did not reach the Polish capital. After careful analysis of German forces concentrated around Warsaw, Home Army leaders decided to halt the operation, as it was too risky. Poles did not have heavy weapons and tanks to face the enemy on equal terms. Operation Revenge was abandoned, and the Corps was dissolved.

In early September 1944, local units of the Home Army planned to capture either Kielce or Radom, also there were plans to seize Częstochowa and Skarzysko. 7th Infantry Division was transferred westwards, to the area of Częstochowa. 2nd Infantry remained near Kielce, actively fighting the enemy until November. In late October 1944, Operation Tempest was cancelled. All units were dissolved.

=== Łódź ===
Operation Tempest in the area of the city of Łódź took place in summer and autumn of 1944, lasting from August 14 until November 26. Local Home Army mobilized here several units, such as the 25th Infantry Regiment under Major Rudolf Majewski. This regiment was stationed in forests near Przysucha: in August 1944, it carried out a number of attacks on German forces, destroying rail lines. The last battle of the 25th regiment took place on November 8, all together it lost 130 men.

Among other units was 29th Kaniow Rifles Regiment, which operated near Brzeziny. On September 14, it captured a German warehouse at the station of Słotwiny near Koluszki.

== Outcome ==
1st company of Sambor command of Drohobycz Armia Krajowa inspectorate during Operation Tempest

The Germans' suppression of the Warsaw Uprising, in the absence of Soviet assistance to the insurgents, marked the end of Operation Tempest. In military terms it was a success, in political terms a defeat. Almost half of the Polish soldiers who took part in Operation Tempest were arrested. They were forcibly conscripted into Berling's army, deported deep into Russia, or simply murdered.

== See also ==
- Polish Underground State
  - Polish government in exile
- History of Poland (1939–1945)
- Polish contribution to World War II
