= Brzeźnik =

Brzeźnik may refer to the following places in Poland:

- Brzeźnik, Lower Silesian Voivodeship (south-west Poland)
- Brzeźnik, Masovian Voivodeship (east-central Poland)
