= Majdan Sobolewski =

- Village
- Location within Poland
- Coordinates: 51°32′N 22°26′E
- Country: Poland
- Voivodeship: Lublin
- County: Lubartów
- Gmina: Firlej
- Population (approx.): 150

Majdan Sobolewski (Polish pronunciation: [ˈmajdan sɔbɔˈlɛfskʲi]) is a village in the administrative district of Gmina Firlej, within Lubartów County, Lublin Voivodeship, in eastern Poland.
