= Nadzieja, Masovian Voivodeship =

Nadzieja
- Village
- Location within Poland
- Coordinates: 52°18′36″N 21°47′19″E
- Country: Poland
- Voivodeship: Masovian
- County: Węgrów
- Gmina: Wierzbno

Nadzieja (Polish pronunciation: [naˈd͡ʑɛja]) is a village in the Gmina Wierzbno, Węgrów County, Masovian Voivodeship, Poland.
