= Soboń =

- Village
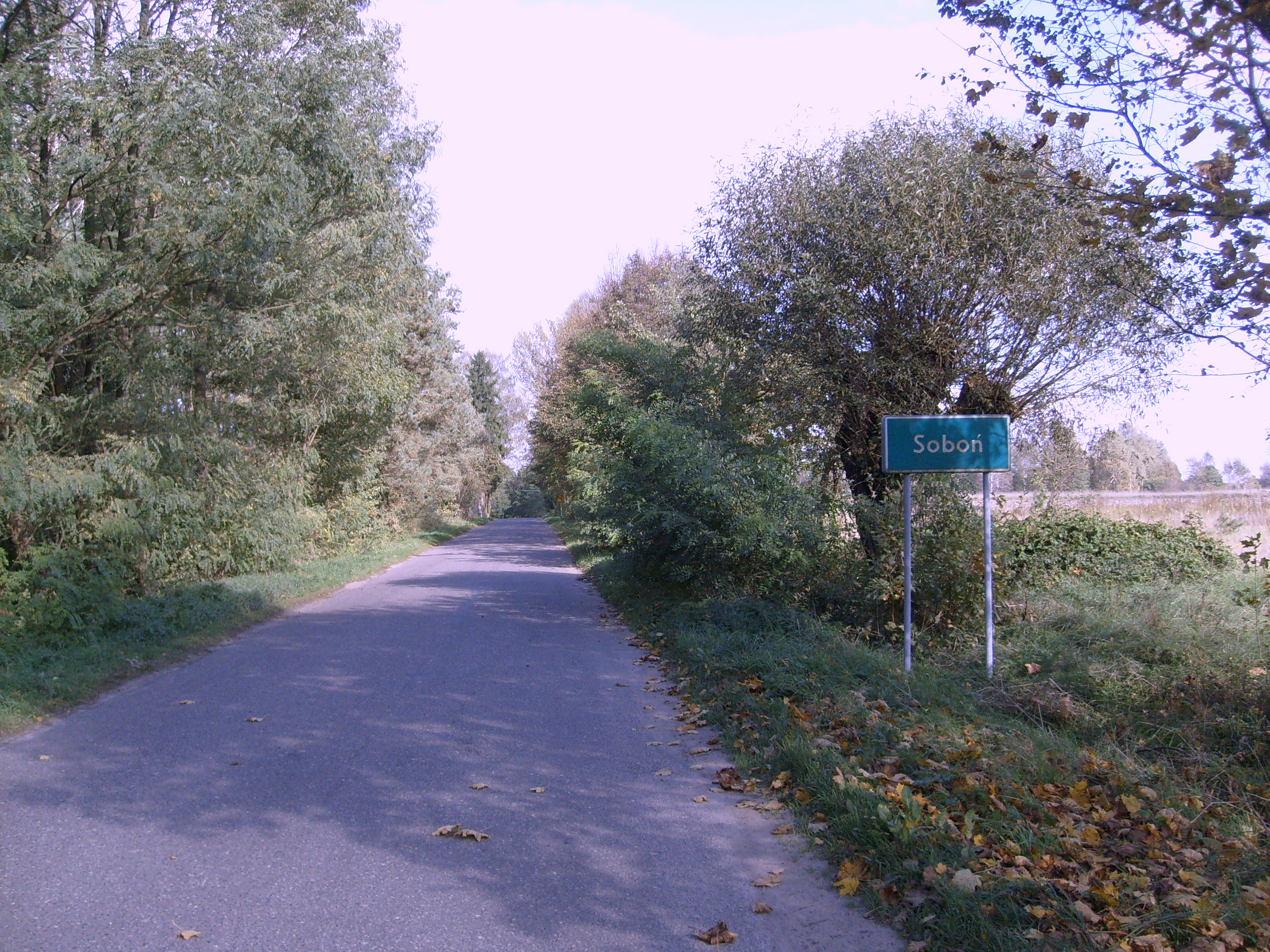
- Road in Soboń.

- Location within Poland
- Coordinates: 52°19′N 21°52′E
- Country: Poland
- Voivodeship: Masovian
- County: Węgrów
- Gmina: Wierzbno

Soboń [ˈsɔbɔɲ] is a village in the administrative district of Gmina Wierzbno, within Węgrów County, Masovian Voivodeship, in east-central Poland.
