= Leszkowice, Lublin Voivodeship =

Leszkowice
- Village
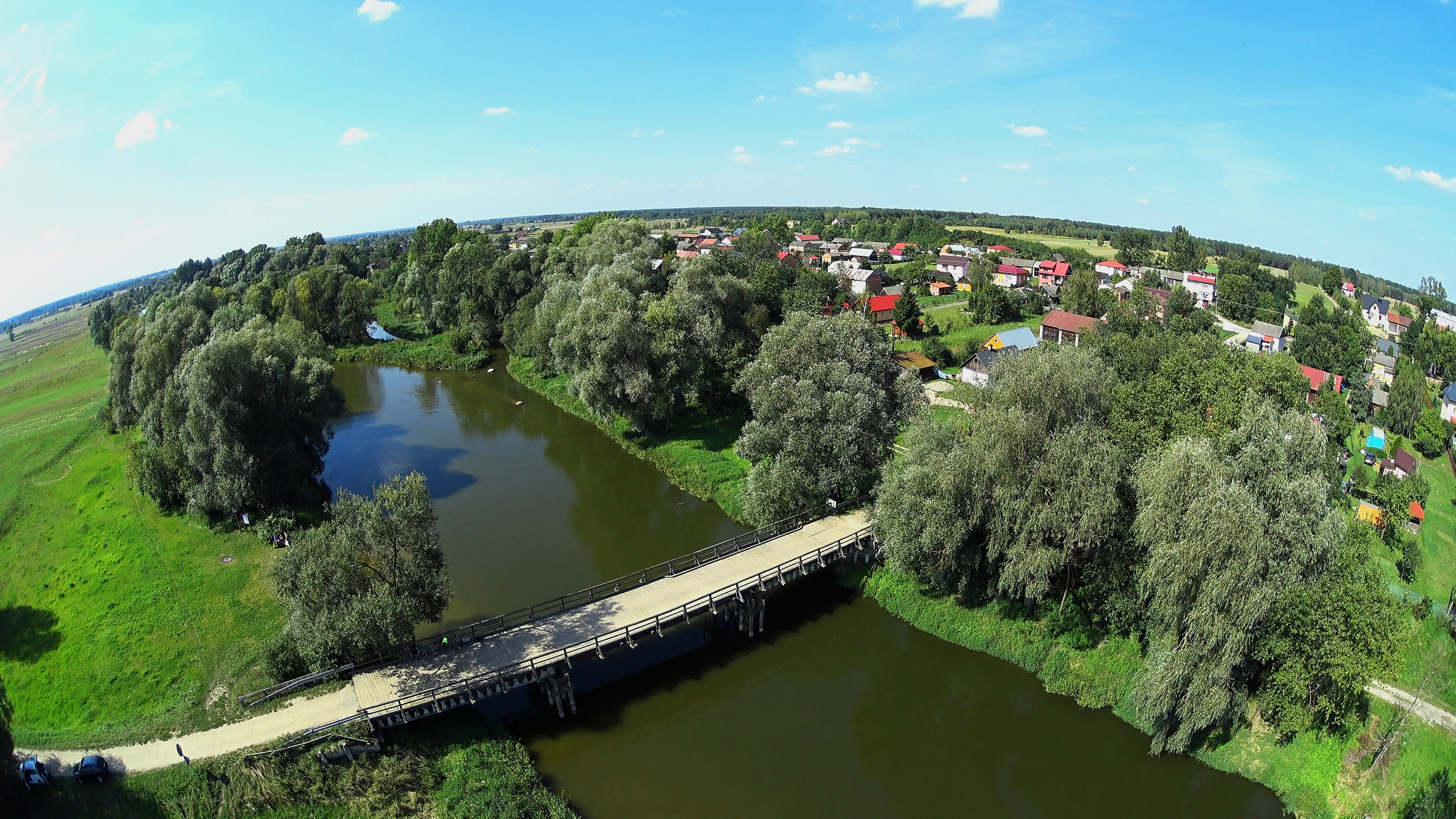
- Aerial view of Leszkowice

- Location within Poland
- Coordinates: 51°33′0″N 22°36′51″E
- Country: Poland
- Voivodeship: Lublin
- County: Lubartów
- Gmina: Ostrówek

Population
  - Total: 930
- Time zone: UTC+1 (CET)
  - Summer (DST): UTC+2 (CEST)

Leszkowice [lɛʂkɔˈvit͡sɛ] is a village in the administrative district of Gmina Ostrówek, within Lubartów County, Lublin Voivodeship, in eastern Poland.

== History ==
Six Polish citizens were murdered by Nazi Germany in the village during World War II.
