= Majdan, Gmina Wierzbno =

Majdan
- Village
- Location within Poland
- Coordinates: 52°15′59″N 21°47′45″E
- Country: Poland
- Voivodeship: Masovian
- County: Węgrów
- Gmina: Wierzbno

Majdan (Polish pronunciation: [ˈmajdan]) is a village in the administrative district of Gmina Wierzbno, within Węgrów County, Masovian Voivodeship, in east-central Poland.
