= Wyględówek =

- Village
- Location within Poland
- Coordinates: 52°18′N 21°47′E
- Country: Poland
- Voivodeship: Masovian
- County: Węgrów
- Gmina: Wierzbno

Wyględówek [vɨɡlɛnˈduvɛk] is a village in the administrative district of Gmina Wierzbno, within Węgrów County, Masovian Voivodeship, in east-central Poland.
