= Ostrówek, Lubartów County =

Ostrówek
- Village
- Location within Poland
- Coordinates: 51°34′47″N 22°36′41″E
- Country: Poland
- Voivodeship: Lublin
- County: Lubartów
- Gmina: Ostrówek

Ostrówek [ɔsˈtruvɛk] is a village in Lubartów County, Lublin Voivodeship, in eastern Poland. It is the seat of the gmina (administrative district) called Gmina Ostrówek.
