= Gmina Wierzbno =

Gmina Wierzbno Wierzbno Commune
- Gmina
- Coat of arms
- Interactive map of Gmina Wierzbno
- Coordinates (Wierzbno): 52°19′N 21°52′E
- Country: Poland
- Voivodeship: Masovian
- County: Węgrów
- Seat: Wierzbno

Area
  - Total: 103.09 km^{2} (39.80 sq mi)

Population (2013)
  - Total: 2,930
  - Density: 28.4/km^{2} (73.6/sq mi)
- Website: https://web.archive.org/web/20061124133139/http://www.powiatwegrowski.pl/powiat/wierzbno.php

Gmina Wierzbno is a rural gmina (administrative district) in Węgrów County, Masovian Voivodeship, in east-central Poland. Its seat is the village of Wierzbno, which lies approximately 15 kilometres (9 mi) south-west of Węgrów and 58 km (36 mi) north-east of Warsaw.

The gmina covers an area of 103.09 square kilometres (39.8 sq mi), and as of 2006 its total population is 3,100 (2,930 in 2013).

== Villages ==
Gmina Wierzbno contains the villages and settlements of Adamów, Brzeźnik, Cierpięta, Czerwonka, Czerwonka-Folwark, Filipy, Helenów, Janówek, Jaworek, Józefy, Karczewiec, Kazimierzów, Koszewnica, Krypy, Las Jaworski, Majdan, Nadzieja, Natolin, Orzechów, Ossówno, Rąbież, Skarżyn, Soboń, Stary Dwór, Strupiechów, Sulki, Świdno, Wąsosze, Wierzbno, Wólka, Wyczółki and Wyględówek.

== Neighbouring gminas ==
Gmina Wierzbno is bordered by the gminas of Dobre, Grębków, Kałuszyn, Korytnica and Liw.
