= Przypisówka =

- Village
- Location within Poland
- Coordinates: 51°33′N 22°34′E
- Country: Poland
- Voivodeship: Lublin
- County: Lubartów
- Gmina: Firlej
- Population (approx.): 530

Przypisówka [pʂɨpiˈsufka] is a village in the administrative district of Gmina Firlej, within Lubartów County, Lublin Voivodeship, in eastern Poland.
