= Wyczółki, Węgrów County =

Wyczółki
- Village
- Location within Poland
- Coordinates: 52°20′N 21°54′E
- Country: Poland
- Voivodeship: Masovian
- County: Węgrów
- Gmina: Wierzbno

Wyczółki [vɨˈt͡ʂuu̯ki] is a village in the administrative district of Gmina Wierzbno, within Węgrów County, Masovian Voivodeship, in east-central Poland.
