= Cierpięta, Węgrów County =

Cierpięta
- Village
- Location within Poland
- Coordinates: 52°17′N 21°51′E
- Country: Poland
- Voivodeship: Masovian
- County: Węgrów
- Gmina: Wierzbno

Cierpięta [t͡ɕɛrˈpjɛnta] is a village in the administrative district of Gmina Wierzbno, within Węgrów County, Masovian Voivodeship, in east-central Poland.
