= Cegielnia, Lubartów County =

Cegielnia
- Village
- Location within Poland
- Coordinates: 51°35′36″N 22°37′30″E
- Country: Poland
- Voivodeship: Lublin
- County: Lubartów
- Gmina: Ostrówek

Cegielnia [t͡sɛˈɡʲɛlɲa] is a village in the administrative district of Gmina Ostrówek, within Lubartów County, Lublin Voivodeship, in eastern Poland.
