= Stary Dwór, Masovian Voivodeship =

Stary Dwór
- Village
- Location within Poland
- Coordinates: 52°15′28″N 21°49′46″E
- Country: Poland
- Voivodeship: Masovian
- County: Węgrów
- Gmina: Wierzbno

Stary Dwór [ˈstarɨ ˈdvur] is a village in the administrative district of Gmina Wierzbno, within Węgrów County, Masovian Voivodeship, in east-central Poland.
