= Ostrówek-Kolonia, Lubartów County =

Ostrówek-Kolonia
- Village
- Location within Poland
- Coordinates: 51°35′38″N 22°36′28″E
- Country: Poland
- Voivodeship: Lublin
- County: Lubartów
- Gmina: Ostrówek

Ostrówek-Kolonia [ɔsˈtruvɛk kɔˈlɔɲa] is a village in the administrative district of Gmina Ostrówek, within Lubartów County, Lublin Voivodeship, in eastern Poland.
