= Kamienowola =

- Village
- Location within Poland
- Coordinates: 51°35′1″N 22°37′37″E
- Country: Poland
- Voivodeship: Lublin
- County: Lubartów
- Gmina: Ostrówek
- Population: 284

Kamienowola [kamjɛnɔˈvɔla] is a village in the administrative district of Gmina Ostrówek, within Lubartów County, Lublin Voivodeship, in eastern Poland.
