= Kraków Uprising (1944) =

Polish Resistance rebellion against German occupation in Poland

The Kraków Uprising was a planned but unrealized uprising of the Polish Resistance against the German occupation in the city of Kraków during World War II.

== Background ==
The summer of 1944 was a busy time for the Home Army (Armia Krajowa) – the largest underground organization in Poland. The Red Army was pushing the Wehrmacht towards the west, and the headquarters of AK decided to launch Operation Tempest (Plan Burza): a series of local uprisings, whose purpose was to seize control of cities and areas where German forces were preparing their defence against the Soviet Red Army, so that Polish underground civilian authorities could take power before the arrival of the Soviets.

Kotwica, one of the symbols of the Armia Krajowa

Several operations took place i.e. Operation Ostra Brama, Lwów Uprising and the biggest and the most important – Warsaw Uprising, however, an uprising planned for months in another key city of the country, Kraków, failed to take place.

== Reasons for the uprising's cancellation ==
According to professor Andrzej Chwalba from Kraków's Jagiellonian University, AK planners wanted to start the uprising most probably on 10 October 1944 (earlier dates had also been considered). This never happened, due to several reasons:

- The Home Army District of Kraków was very numerous, with soldiers wanting to start an insurrection, but lacking weapons. It has been estimated that only some 10 to 15 percent of Kraków's AK units were armed.
- Kraków was the capital of the General Government, and the Wehrmacht garrison was 30,000 strong, or twice as numerous as in three-times bigger Warsaw. Also, some 10,000 German officials, all of them armed, were stationed in Kraków.
- In the summer of 1944, the Red Army stopped its offensive, after reaching the Vistula river line. This gave the edge to the Germans in Kraków, who started to muster their troops.
- On 6 August 1944 the Gestapo, fearing of another uprising, ordered a round-up of all able-bodied young men in Kraków.
- Roman Catholic Archbishop Adam Stefan Sapieha, the most respected Polish official who stayed in Kraków, strongly opposed the idea of the uprising. It is known that Sapieha asked General Josef Harpe of the German Army to proclaim Kraków an “open city”, which would help save both the population and historic buildings. On 7 August 1944 Harpe answered stating that Kraków would be defended, but promised that the Wehrmacht would try to spare the civilians. However, the General warned that in case of an uprising, the whole city would be destroyed.

According to Teodor Gasiorowski, a historian from the Kraków office of the Institute of National Remembrance, AK units in Kraków were going to concentrate their attack on a German district, located in the area of Akademia Gorniczo-Hutnicza (University of Science and Technology). Operating from Lasek Wolski (Wolski Forest Preserve), soldiers of the elite “Skała” (“Rock”) Shock Battalion were going to capture German officials and seize the administration buildings. However, German superiority within the city was crushing and all plans were called off. It is very likely that the occupation authorities knew about a possible uprising, and on 3 September 1944 Hans Frank appealed to the “proud Archbishop of Kraków” to halt the plans.

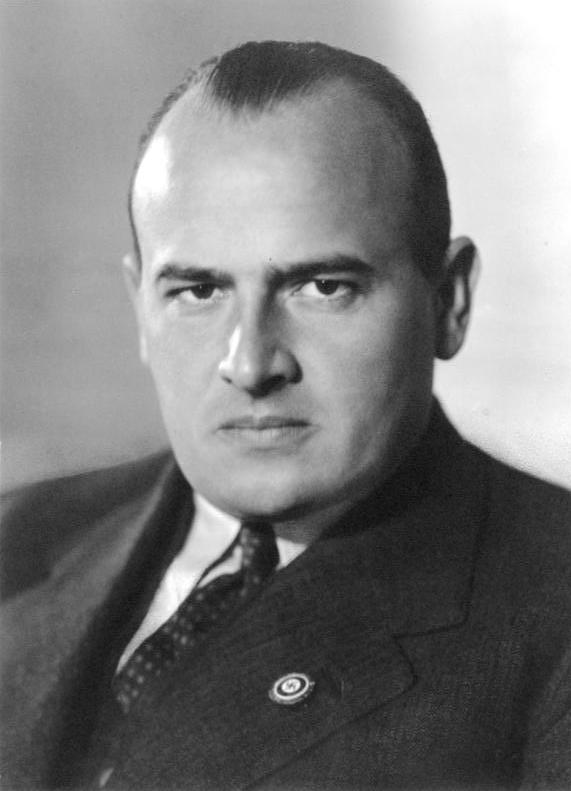
Hans Frank, the Governor-General of the General Government.

Instead, Kraków decided to give the Polish capital its best men. Upon order of AK headquarters, Battalion Skala went on a dangerous journey across Poland, towards fighting Warsaw. Polish planners were hoping to get across German lines, counting on low morale of German soldiers. However, they were stopped in the area of Miechów, with a division of Wehrmacht facing them.

Norman Davies in his book "Rising '44" writes about events that took place at the beginning of August 1944: "Meanwhile in Cracow, the authorities of the General Government reacted by ordering a preemptive round-up of young men, similar to the one that had misfired the previous week in Warsaw. On this occasion, the Gestapo took no chances (...) At 10 Tyniec street, they broke in, but failed to find the twenty-four-year-old Underground actor and aspirant priest, who was praying on his knees (...) When they left, a young woman guided the fugitive to the archbishop's palace. He was taken in, given the cassock to wear, and was told to present himself as one of the archbishop's 'secretaries'. In this way, Karol Wojtyla took a major step towards ordination, and in the long term – towards the Throne of St. Peter".

Another author, George Weigel, also mentions situation in Kraków in early August 1944: "August 6, the liturgical feast of the Transfiguration, was 'Black Sunday' in Kraków as the Gestapo swept the city, rounding up young men to forestall a reprise of the Warsaw Uprising".

== Sources ==
- http://www.malopolskie.iap.pl/?id=wiadomosci&nrwiad=139467
- http://ww6.tvp.pl/369,20070801534482.strona
- https://web.archive.org/web/20070901160752/http://www.ipn.gov.pl/portal.php?serwis=pl&dzial=376&id=958
- http://miasta.gazeta.pl/krakow/1,35798,4355189.html
- http://miechow.info/?pId=7&s=3
- http://www.tygodnik.com.pl/numer/2714/kalendarium.html
- Norman Davies, Rising '44, pp. 253–254, 2004 Viking Penguin ISBN 0-670-03284-0
- George Weigel, Witness to Hope, p. 71, 2001 HarperCollins Publishers, ISBN 0-06-018793-X
