= Stary Antonin =

- Village
- Location within Poland
- Coordinates: 51°35′14″N 22°26′44″E
- Country: Poland
- Voivodeship: Lublin
- County: Lubartów
- Gmina: Firlej
- Time zone: UTC+1 (CET)
  - Summer (DST): UTC+2 (CEST)

Stary Antonin (Polish pronunciation: [ˈstarɨ anˈtɔɲin]) is a village in the administrative district of Gmina Firlej, within Lubartów County, Lublin Voivodeship, in eastern Poland.

== History ==
Six Polish citizens were murdered by Nazi Germany in the village during World War II.
