= Babczyzna =

- Village
- Location within Poland
- Coordinates: 51°39′N 22°30′E
- Country: Poland
- Voivodeship: Lublin
- County: Lubartów
- Gmina: Ostrówek

Babczyzna [bapˈt͡ʂɨzna] is a village in the administrative district of Gmina Ostrówek, within Lubartów County, Lublin Voivodeship, in eastern Poland.
