= Wólka Mieczysławska =

- Village
- Location within Poland
- Coordinates: 51°30′32″N 22°29′52″E
- Country: Poland
- Voivodeship: Lublin
- County: Lubartów
- Gmina: Firlej

Wólka Mieczysławska [ˈvulka mjɛt͡ʂɨˈswafska] is a village in the administrative district of Gmina Firlej, within Lubartów County, Lublin Voivodeship, in eastern Poland.
