= Baran, Lublin Voivodeship =

Baran
- Village
- Location within Poland
- Coordinates: 51°32′12″N 22°29′16″E
- Country: Poland
- Voivodeship: Lublin
- County: Lubartów
- Gmina: Firlej
- Elevation: 149 m (489 ft)

Population (2011)
  - Total: 110
- Time zone: UTC+1 (CET)
  - Summer (DST): UTC+2 (CEST)
- Postal code: 21136
- Area code: +(48) 81
- Vehicle registration: LLB

Baran (IPA: [ˈbaran]) is a Polish village in the administrative district of Gmina Firlej, within Lubartów County, Lublin Voivodeship, in eastern Poland.

== History ==
Eight Polish citizens were murdered by Nazi Germany in the village during World War II.

From 1975 to 1998, the village was administered under the former Lublin Voivodeship. Since 1999 it has been part of the new Lublin Voivodeship.
