= Jeleń, Lublin Voivodeship =

Jeleń
- Village
- Location within Poland
- Coordinates: 51°36′38″N 22°35′50″E
- Country: Poland
- Voivodeship: Lublin
- County: Lubartów
- Gmina: Ostrówek

Jeleń [ˈjɛlɛɲ] is a village in the administrative district of Gmina Ostrówek, within Lubartów County, Lublin Voivodeship, in eastern Poland.
