= Adamów, Węgrów County =

Adamów
- Village
- Location within Poland
- Coordinates: 52°18′59″N 21°48′17″E
- Country: Poland
- Voivodeship: Masovian
- County: Węgrów
- Gmina: Wierzbno

Adamów [aˈdamuf] is a village in the administrative district of Gmina Wierzbno, within Węgrów County, Masovian Voivodeship, in east-central Poland.
