= Las Jaworski =

- Village
- Location within Poland
- Coordinates: 52°17′48″N 21°52′58″E
- Country: Poland
- Voivodeship: Masovian
- County: Węgrów
- Gmina: Wierzbno

Las Jaworski [ˈlas jaˈvɔrski] is a village in the administrative district of Gmina Wierzbno, within Węgrów County, Masovian Voivodeship, in east-central Poland.
