= Świdno, Węgrów County =

Świdno
- Village
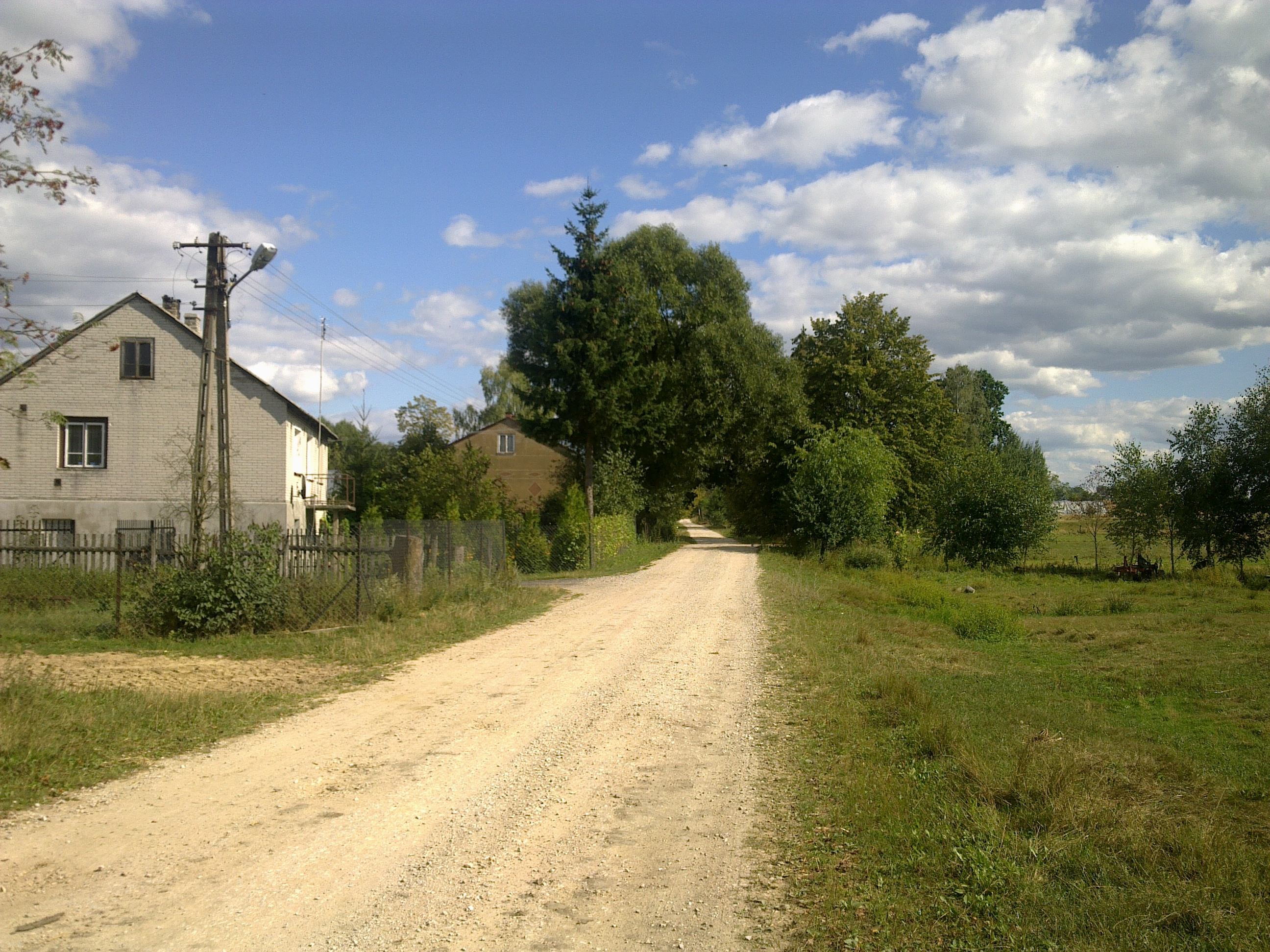

- Location within Poland
- Coordinates: 52°18′41″N 21°49′17″E
- Country: Poland
- Voivodeship: Masovian
- County: Węgrów
- Gmina: Wierzbno

Świdno [ˈɕfidnɔ] is a village in the administrative district of Gmina Wierzbno, within Węgrów County, Masovian Voivodeship, in east-central Poland.
