= Zagrody Łukówieckie =

- Village
- Location within Poland
- Coordinates: 51°34′42″N 22°29′33″E
- Country: Poland
- Voivodeship: Lublin
- County: Lubartów
- Gmina: Firlej

Zagrody Łukówieckie [zaˈɡrɔdɨ wukuˈvjɛt͡skʲɛ] is a village in the administrative district of Gmina Firlej, within Lubartów County, Lublin Voivodeship, in eastern Poland.
