= Koszewnica, Węgrów County =

Koszewnica
- Village
- Location within Poland
- Coordinates: 52°20′N 21°53′E
- Country: Poland
- Voivodeship: Masovian
- County: Węgrów
- Gmina: Wierzbno
- Time zone: UTC+1 (CET)
  - Summer (DST): UTC+2 (CEST)

Koszewnica [kɔʂɛvˈnit͡sa] is a village in the administrative district of Gmina Wierzbno, within Węgrów County, Masovian Voivodeship, in east-central Poland.

Six Polish citizens were murdered by Nazi Germany in the village during World War II.
