= Karczewiec, Masovian Voivodeship =

Karczewiec
- Village
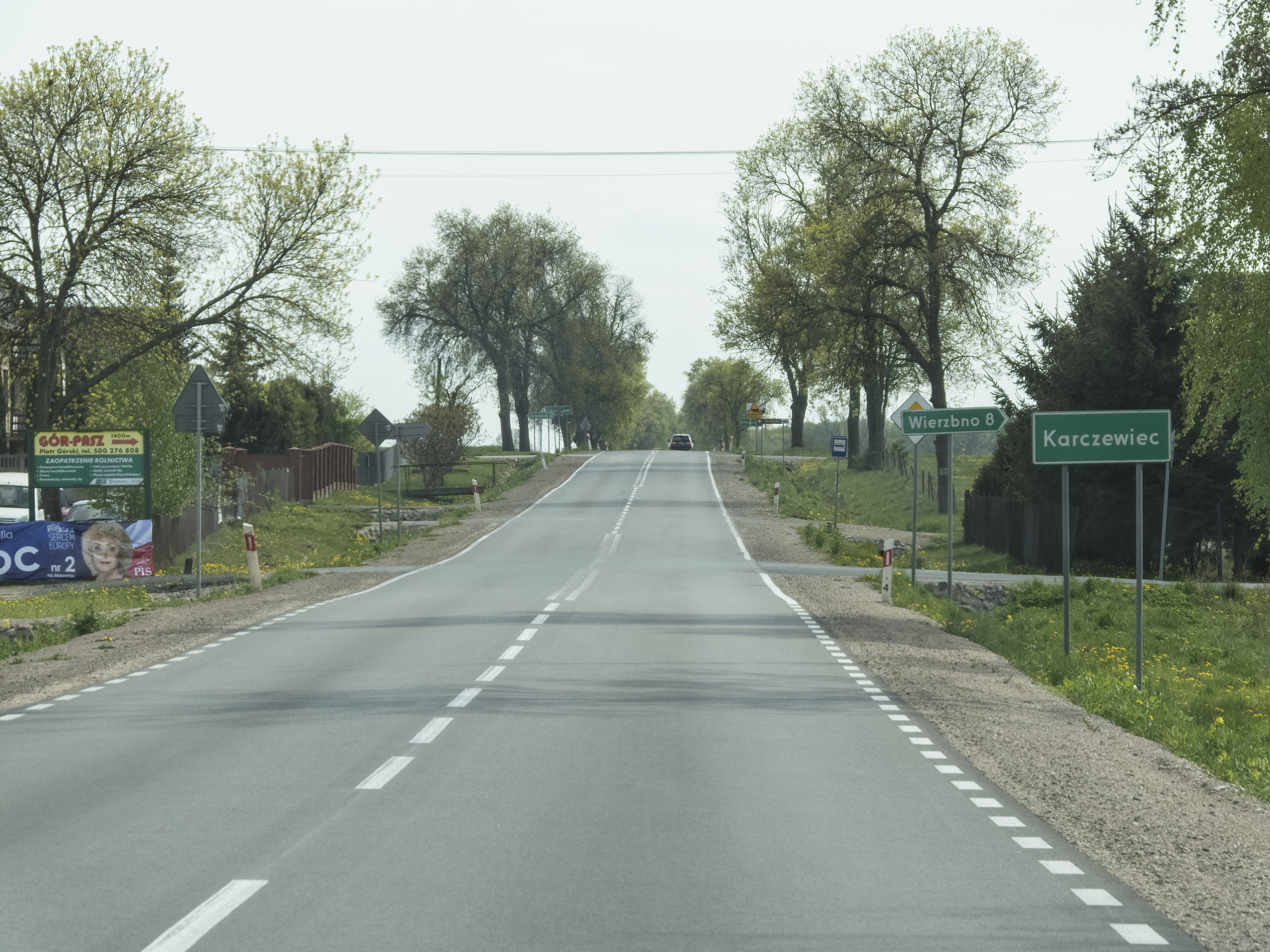

- Location within Poland
- Coordinates: 52°20′02″N 21°56′06″E
- Country: Poland
- Voivodeship: Masovian
- County: Węgrów
- Gmina: Wierzbno

Karczewiec [karˈt͡ʂɛvjɛt͡s] is a village in the administrative district of Gmina Wierzbno, within Węgrów County, Masovian Voivodeship, in east-central Poland.
