= Luszawa =

- Village
- Location within Poland
- Coordinates: 51°35′N 22°34′E
- Country: Poland
- Voivodeship: Lublin
- County: Lubartów
- Gmina: Ostrówek
- Population: 376

Luszawa [luˈʂava] is a village in the administrative district of Gmina Ostrówek, within Lubartów County, Lublin Voivodeship, in eastern Poland.
