= Żurawiniec-Kolonia =

- Village
- Location within Poland
- Coordinates: 51°36′47″N 22°33′43″E
- Country: Poland
- Voivodeship: Lublin
- County: Lubartów
- Gmina: Ostrówek

Żurawiniec-Kolonia [ʐuraˈviɲɛt͡s kɔˈlɔɲa] is a village in the administrative district of Gmina Ostrówek, within Lubartów County, Lublin Voivodeship, in eastern Poland.
