= Antoniówka, Lubartów County =

Antoniówka
- Village
- Location within Poland
- Coordinates: 51°34′50″N 22°40′11″E
- Country: Poland
- Voivodeship: Lublin
- County: Lubartów
- Gmina: Ostrówek

Antoniówka [antɔˈɲufka] is a village in the administrative district of Gmina Ostrówek, within Lubartów County, Lublin Voivodeship, in eastern Poland.
