= Seul-ki =

- Hangul: 슬기
- RR: Seulgi
- MR: Sŭlgi

Seul-ki, also spelled Seul-gi or Sul-ki, is a Korean given name. It was the 8th-most popular name for baby girls born in South Korea in 1990. The word itself is a native Korean word meaning "wisdom" and does not have corresponding hanja. However, since Korean given names can be created arbitrarily, it may also be a name with hanja (e.g. 璱起).

People with this name include:

Sportspeople

- Bae Seul-ki (footballer) (born 1985), South Korean male football centre back
- Go Seul-ki (born 1986), South Korean male football forward
- Lee Seul-gi (born 1986), South Korean male football midfielder
- Catherine Kang (Korean name Kang Seul-ki, born 1987), South Korean-born Central African female taekwondo practitioner
- Jung Seul-ki (born 1988), South Korean female swimmer
- Cheon Seul-ki (born 1989), South Korean female field hockey player
- Ahn Seul-ki (born 1992), South Korean female long-distance runner
- Kim Seul-ki (born 1992), South Korean male football winger

Entertainers

- Kang Eun-tak (born Shin Seul-gi, 1982), South Korean actor
- Bae Seul-ki (born 1986), South Korean female pop singer
- Kim Seul-gi (born 1991), South Korean actress
- Seulgi (born Kang Seul-gi, 1994), South Korean female pop singer, member of girl group Red Velvet
- Shin Seul-ki (born 1998), South Korean actress

== See also ==
- List of Korean given names
