= Bykowszczyzna =

- Village
- Location within Poland
- Coordinates: 51°36′15″N 22°28′39″E
- Country: Poland
- Voivodeship: Lublin
- County: Lubartów
- Gmina: Firlej

Bykowszczyzna [bɨkɔfʂˈt͡ʂɨzna] is a village in the administrative district of Gmina Firlej, within Lubartów County, Lublin Voivodeship, in eastern Poland.
