= Wierzbno, Węgrów County =

Wierzbno
- Village
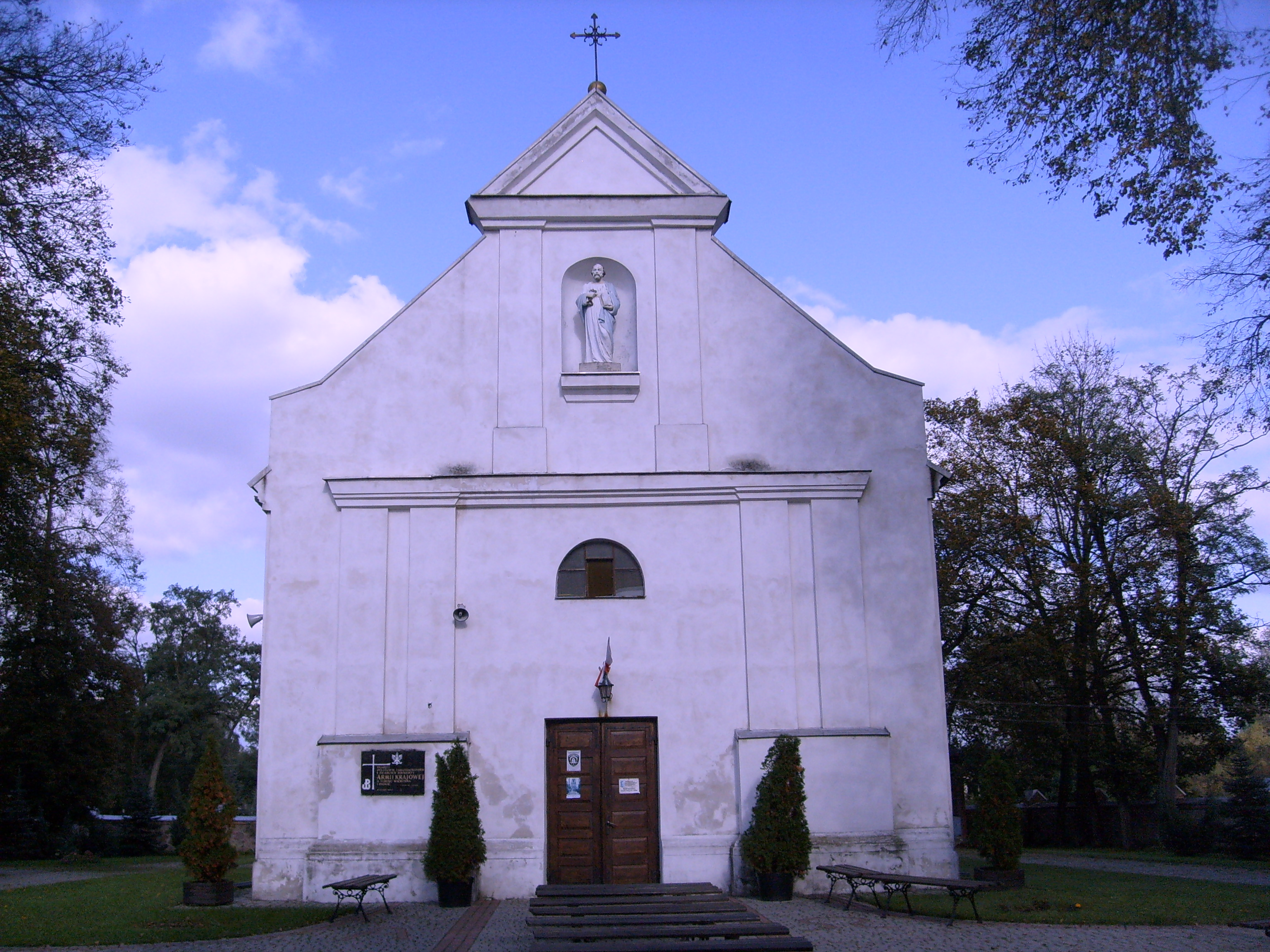
- Church in Wierzbno.

- Location within Poland
- Coordinates: 52°19′N 21°52′E
- Country: Poland
- Voivodeship: Masovian
- County: Węgrów
- Gmina: Wierzbno

Wierzbno [ˈvjɛʐbnɔ] is a village in Węgrów County, Masovian Voivodeship, in east-central Poland. It is the seat of the gmina (administrative district) called Gmina Wierzbno.
