= Kazimierzów, Gmina Wierzbno =

Kazimierzów
- Village
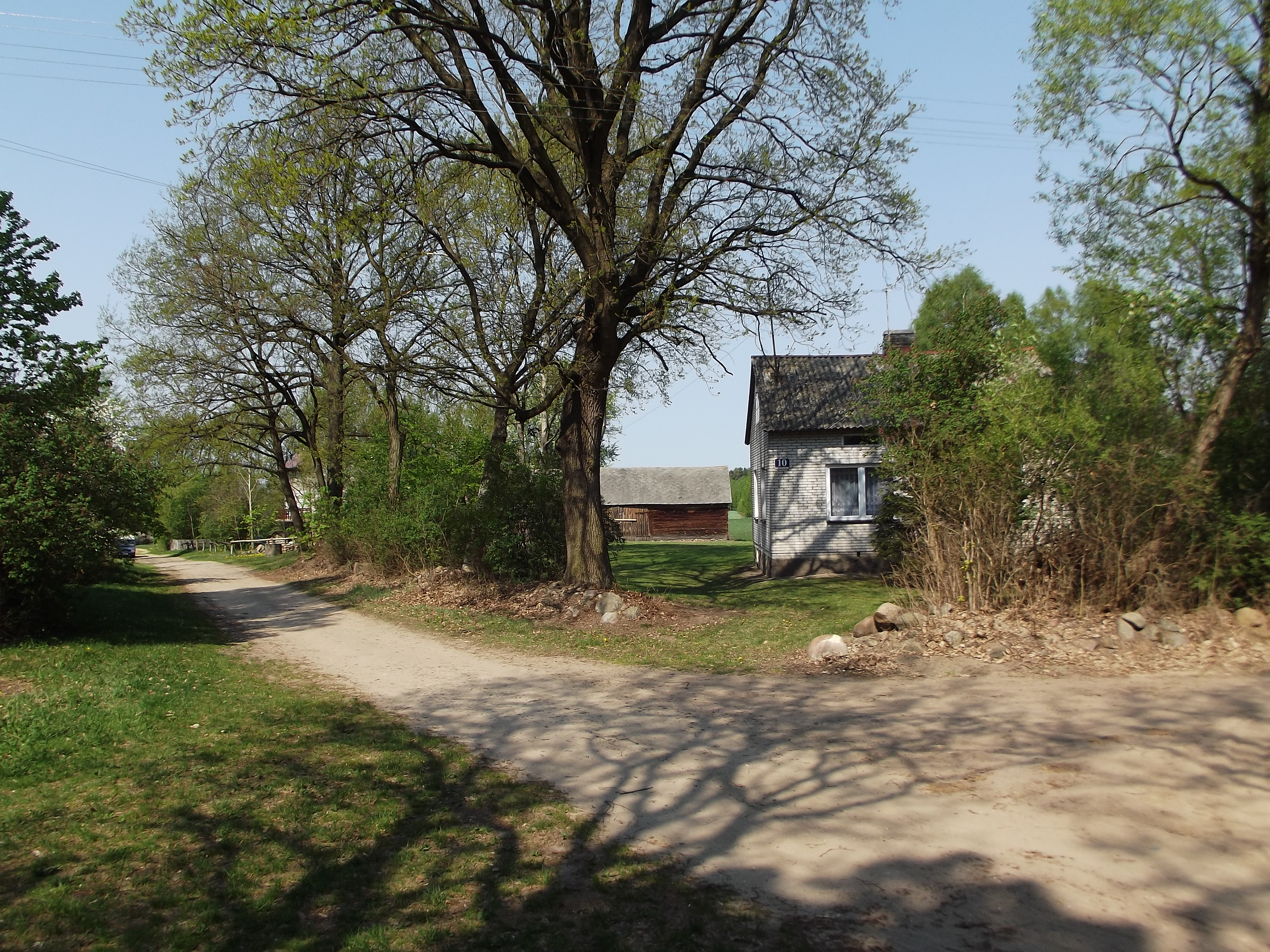
- Unpaved road in Kazimierzów

- Location within Poland
- Coordinates: 52°16′05″N 21°49′40″E
- Country: Poland
- Voivodeship: Masovian
- County: Węgrów
- Gmina: Wierzbno

Kazimierzów [kaʑiˈmjɛʐuf] is a village in the administrative district of Gmina Wierzbno, within Węgrów County, Masovian Voivodeship, in east-central Poland.
