= Helenów, Węgrów County =

Helenów
- Village
- Location within Poland
- Coordinates: 52°17′28″N 21°51′20″E
- Country: Poland
- Voivodeship: Masovian
- County: Węgrów
- Gmina: Wierzbno

Helenów [xɛˈlɛnuf] is a village in the administrative district of Gmina Wierzbno, within Węgrów County, Masovian Voivodeship, in east-central Poland.
