= Nowy Antonin =

- Village
- Location within Poland
- Coordinates: 51°34′38″N 22°26′25″E
- Country: Poland
- Voivodeship: Lublin
- County: Lubartów
- Gmina: Firlej
- Time zone: UTC+1 (CET)
  - Summer (DST): UTC+2 (CEST)

Nowy Antonin (Polish pronunciation: [ˈnɔvɨ anˈtɔɲin]) is a village in the administrative district of Gmina Firlej, within Lubartów County, Lublin Voivodeship, in eastern Poland.

== History ==
Ten people, including two Polish citizens, were murdered by Nazi Germany in the village during World War II.
