= Tyśmienica (Wieprz) =

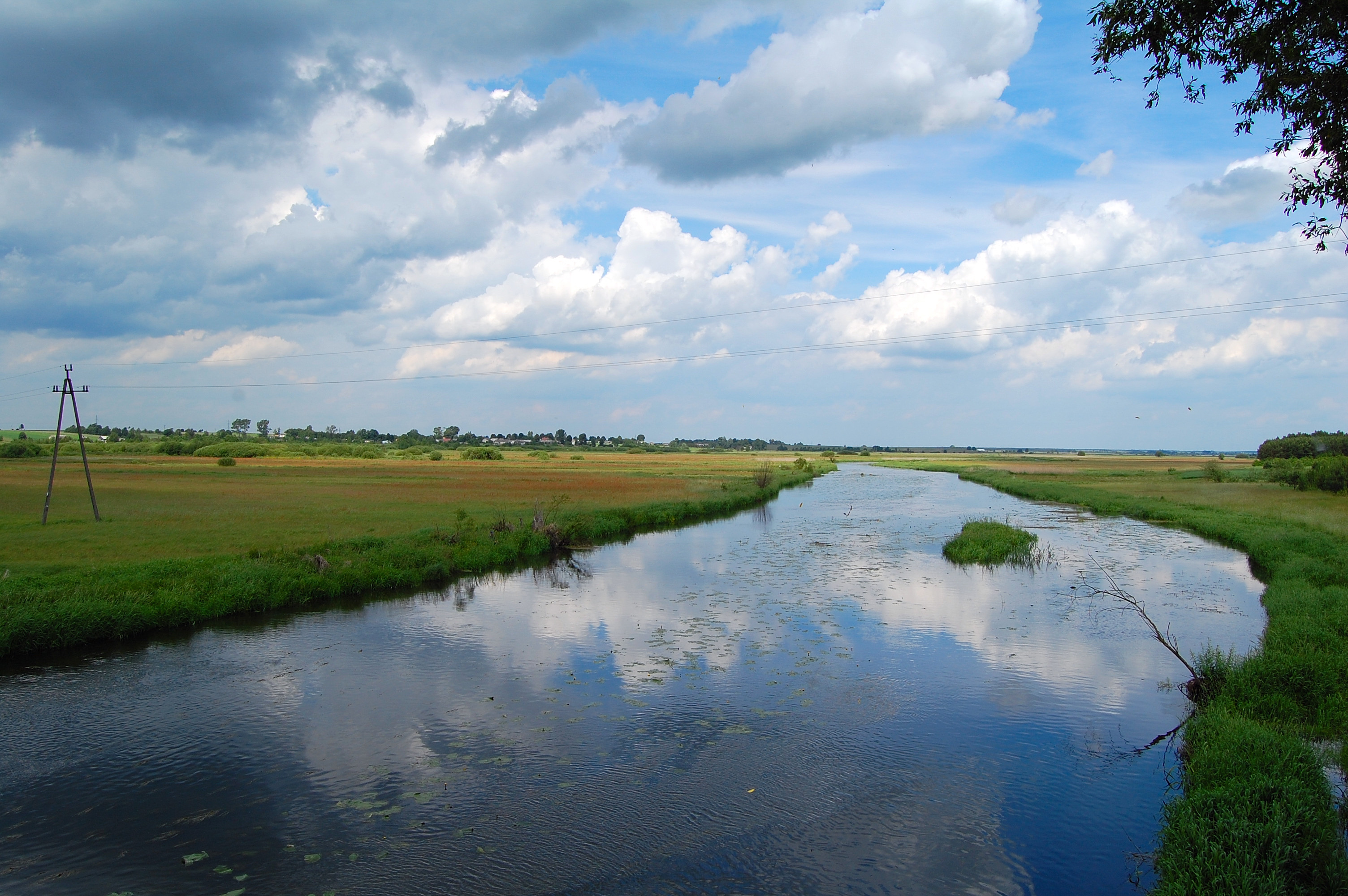

Location
- Country: Poland

Physical characteristics
- Mouth
  - location: Wieprz
  - coordinates: 51°36′51″N 22°25′22″E
- Length: 77km

Basin features
- Progression: Wieprz→ Vistula→ Baltic Sea
- Tributaries
  - left: Piskornica, Brzostówka, Dopływ spod Gródka, Dopływ spod Babianki
  - right: Piwonia, Bobrówka, Ochożanka, Stara Piwonia, Bystrzyca, Czarna

Tyśmienica is a river in east central Poland, a tributary of the river Wieprz. Tyśmienica flows through Lublin Voivodeship, at the length of 75 kilometres (47 mi). It begins in an unnamed lake near Dratów and empties into Wieprz around Wola Skromowska village. It has a drainage basin of 2,700 square kilometres (1,000 sq mi).
