= Krypy, Gmina Wierzbno =

Krypy
- Village
- Location within Poland
- Coordinates: 52°20′02″N 21°55′53″E
- Country: Poland
- Voivodeship: Masovian
- County: Węgrów
- Gmina: Wierzbno

Krypy [ˈkrɨpɨ] is a village in the administrative district of Gmina Wierzbno, within Węgrów County, Masovian Voivodeship, in east-central Poland.
