= Sobolew-Kolonia =

- Village
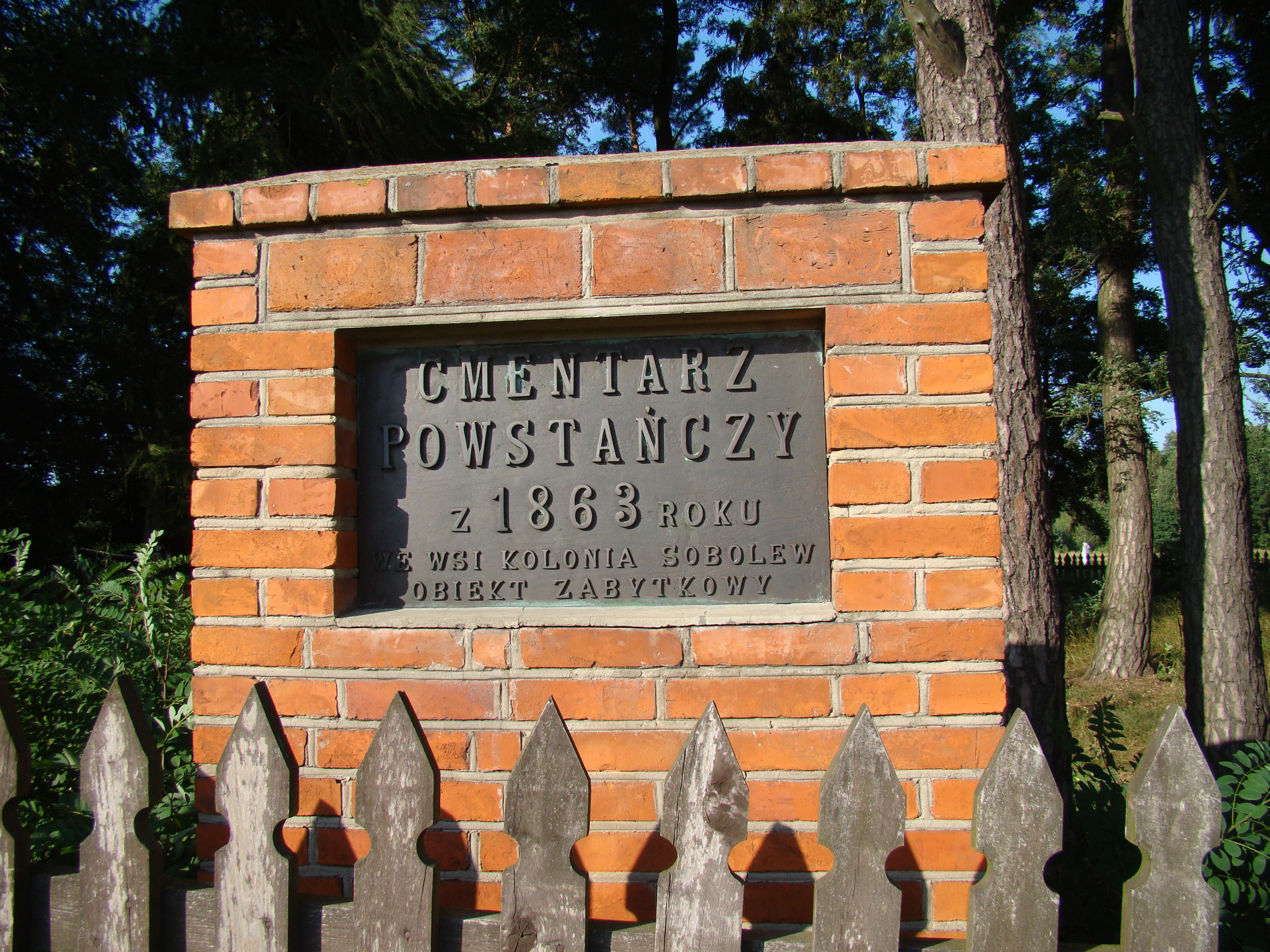

- Location within Poland
- Coordinates: 51°30′54″N 22°27′20″E
- Country: Poland
- Voivodeship: Lublin
- County: Lubartów
- Gmina: Firlej

Sobolew-Kolonia [sɔˈbɔlɛf kɔˈlɔɲa] is a village in the administrative district of Gmina Firlej, within Lubartów County, Lublin Voivodeship, in eastern Poland.
