= Skarżyn, Węgrów County =

Skarżyn
- Village
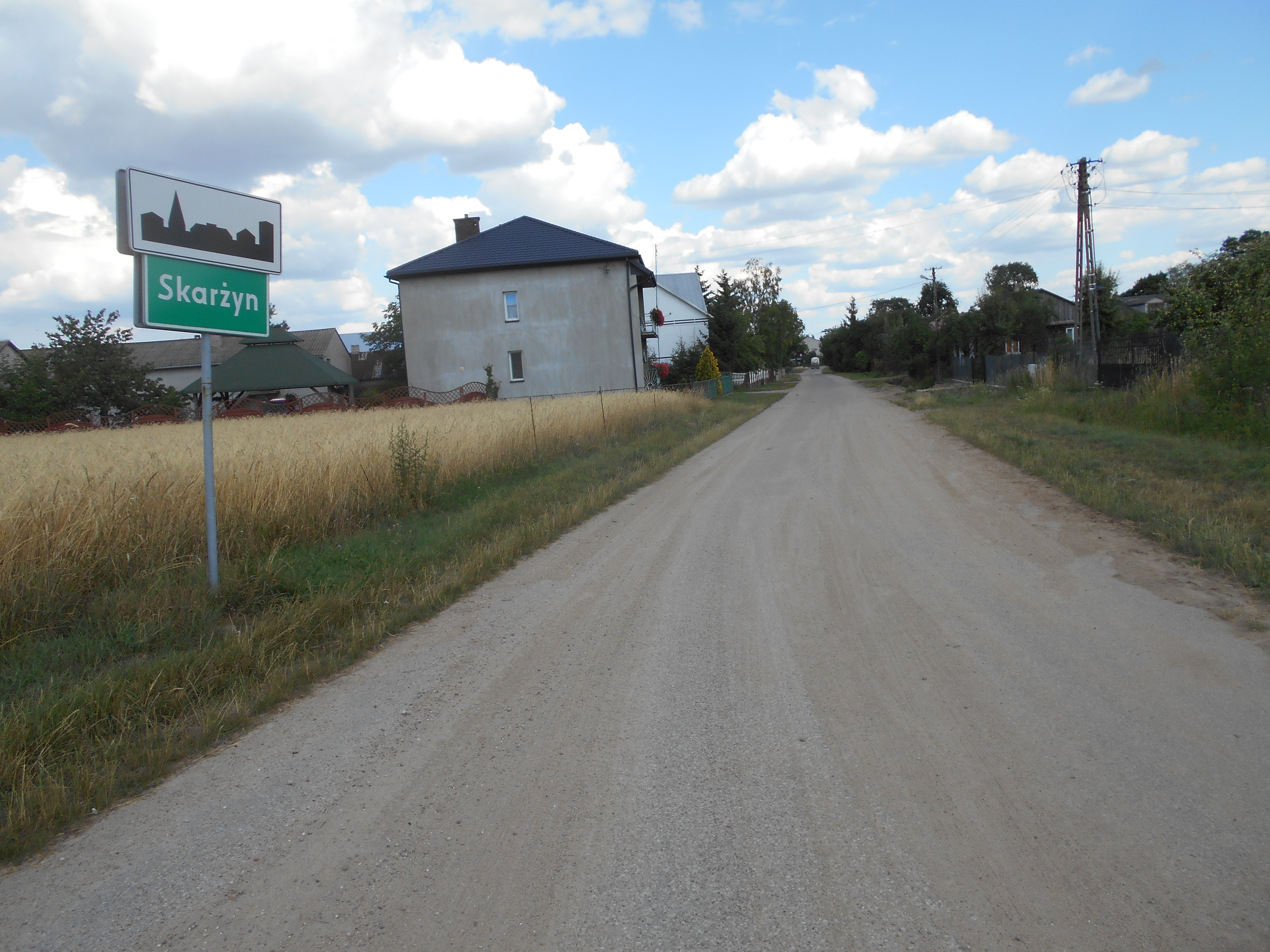

- Location within Poland
- Coordinates: 52°20′28″N 21°50′11″E
- Country: Poland
- Voivodeship: Masovian
- County: Węgrów
- Gmina: Wierzbno

Skarżyn [ˈskarʐɨn] is a village in the administrative district of Gmina Wierzbno, within Węgrów County, Masovian Voivodeship, in east-central Poland.
