= Pożarów, Lublin Voivodeship =

Pożarów
- Village
- Location within Poland
- Coordinates: 51°37′N 22°30′E
- Country: Poland
- Voivodeship: Lublin
- County: Lubartów
- Gmina: Firlej

Pożarów [pɔˈʐaruf] is a village in the administrative district of Gmina Firlej, within Lubartów County, Lublin Voivodeship, in eastern Poland.
