= Zawada, Lubartów County =

Zawada
- Village
- Location within Poland
- Coordinates: 51°37′31″N 22°36′7″E
- Country: Poland
- Voivodeship: Lublin
- County: Lubartów
- Gmina: Ostrówek
- Time zone: UTC+1 (CET)
  - Summer (DST): UTC+2 (CEST)

Zawada [zaˈvada] is a village in the administrative district of Gmina Ostrówek, within Lubartów County, Lublin Voivodeship, in eastern Poland.

== History ==
Three Polish citizens were murdered by Nazi Germany in the village during World War II.
