= Rąbież, Gmina Wierzbno =

Rąbież
- Village
- Location within Poland
- Coordinates: 52°17′58″N 21°53′10″E
- Country: Poland
- Voivodeship: Masovian
- County: Węgrów
- Gmina: Wierzbno

Rąbież [ˈrɔmbjɛʂ] is a village in the administrative district of Gmina Wierzbno, within Węgrów County, Masovian Voivodeship, in east-central Poland.
