= Dębica-Kolonia =

- Village
- Location within Poland
- Coordinates: 51°36′17″N 22°37′38″E
- Country: Poland
- Voivodeship: Lublin
- County: Lubartów
- Gmina: Ostrówek

Dębica-Kolonia [dɛmˈbit͡sa kɔˈlɔɲa] is a village in the administrative district of Gmina Ostrówek, within Lubartów County, Lublin Voivodeship, in eastern Poland.
