= Żurawiniec, Lublin Voivodeship =

Żurawiniec
- Village
- Location within Poland
- Coordinates: 51°35′45″N 22°32′56″E
- Country: Poland
- Voivodeship: Lublin
- County: Lubartów
- Gmina: Ostrówek

Żurawiniec [ʐuraˈviɲɛt͡s] is a village in the administrative district of Gmina Ostrówek, within Lubartów County, Lublin Voivodeship, in eastern Poland.
