= Czerwonka, Węgrów County =

Czerwonka
- Village
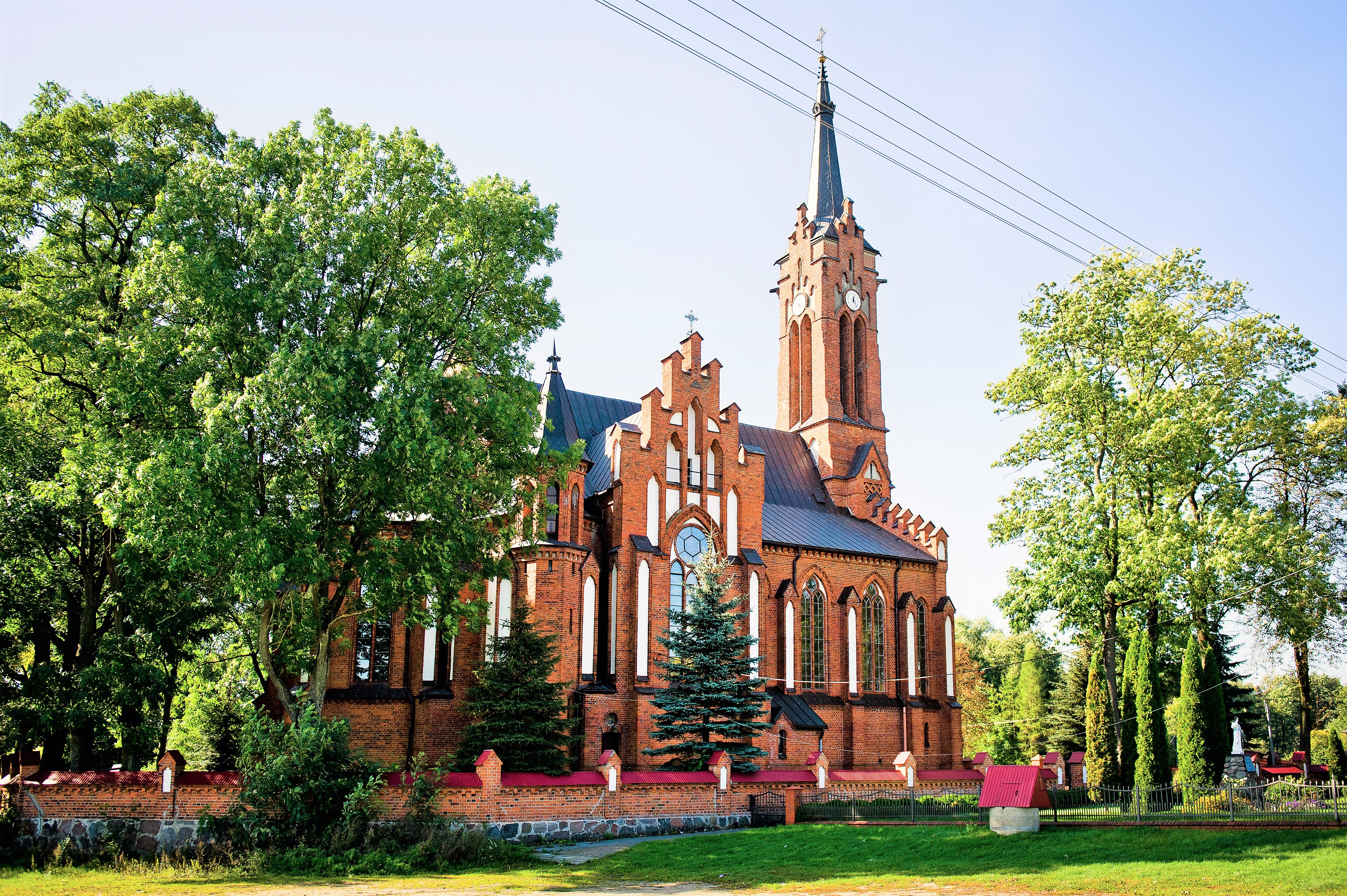

- Location within Poland
- Coordinates: 52°21′07″N 21°52′46″E
- Country: Poland
- Voivodeship: Masovian
- County: Węgrów
- Gmina: Wierzbno

Czerwonka [t͡ʂɛrˈvɔnka] is a village in the administrative district of Gmina Wierzbno, within Węgrów County, Masovian Voivodeship, in east-central Poland.
