= Brzeźnik, Masovian Voivodeship =

Brzeźnik
- Village
- Location within Poland
- Coordinates: 52°19′46″N 21°44′41″E
- Country: Poland
- Voivodeship: Masovian
- County: Węgrów
- Gmina: Wierzbno

Brzeźnik [ˈbʐɛʑnik] is a village in the administrative district of Gmina Wierzbno, within Węgrów County, Masovian Voivodeship, in east-central Poland.
