= Tarkawica =

- Village
- Location within Poland
- Coordinates: 51°38′N 22°32′E
- Country: Poland
- Voivodeship: Lublin
- County: Lubartów
- Gmina: Ostrówek

Tarkawica [tarkaˈvit͡sa] is a village in the administrative district of Gmina Ostrówek, within Lubartów County, Lublin Voivodeship, in eastern Poland.
