= Łukówiec, Lublin Voivodeship =

Łukówiec
- Village
- Location within Poland
- Coordinates: 51°35′16″N 22°30′06″E
- Country: Poland
- Voivodeship: Lublin
- County: Lubartów
- Gmina: Firlej
- Time zone: UTC+1 (CET)
  - Summer (DST): UTC+2 (CEST)

Łukówiec [wuˈkuvjɛt͡s] is a village in Gmina Firlej, Lubartów County, Lublin Voivodeship, Poland.

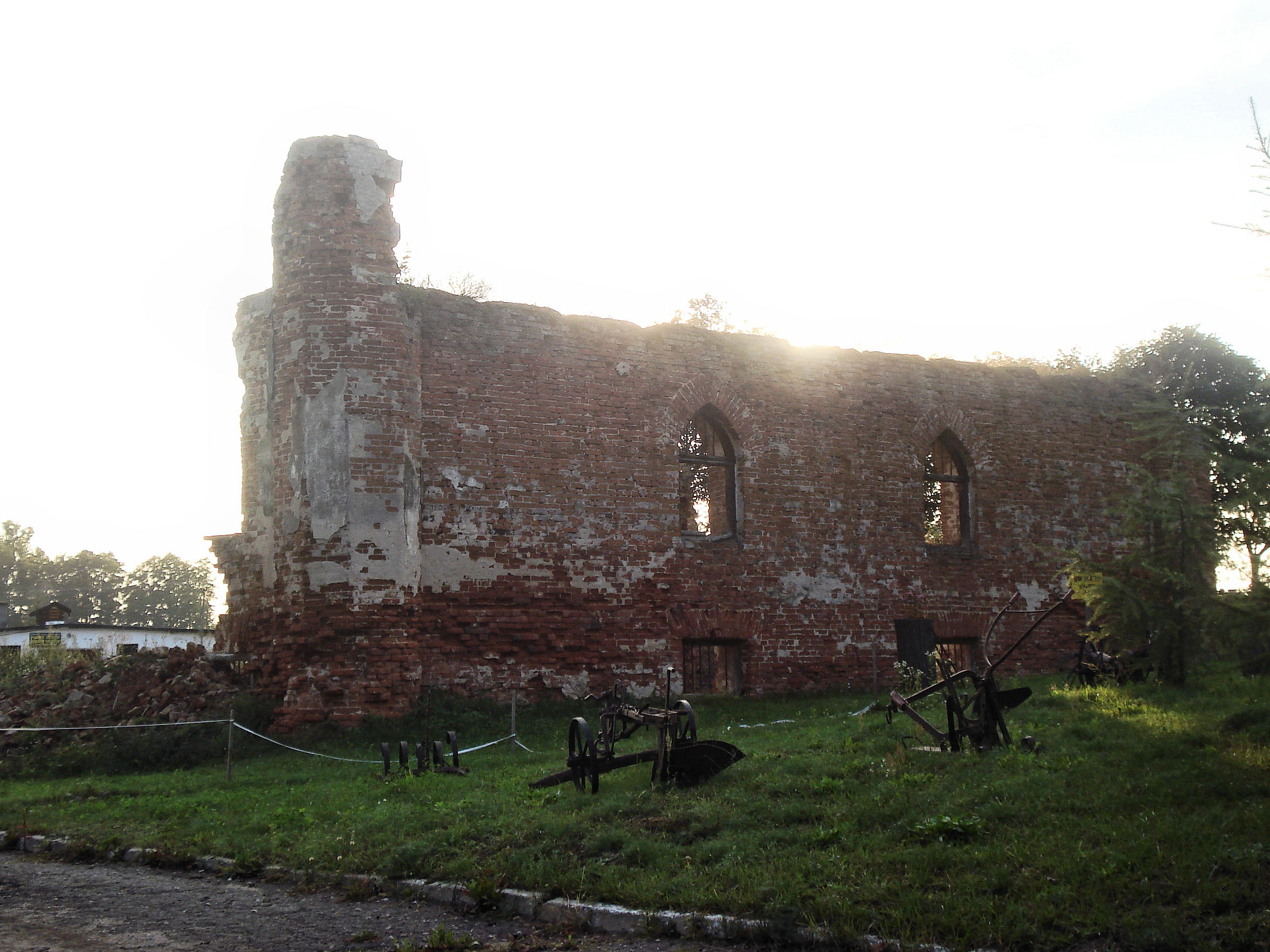
Ruins of manor complex in Łukówiec

== History ==
Four Polish citizens were murdered by Nazi Germany in the village during World War II.
