= Gmina Ostrówek, Lublin Voivodeship =

Gmina Ostrówek Ostrówek Commune
- Gmina
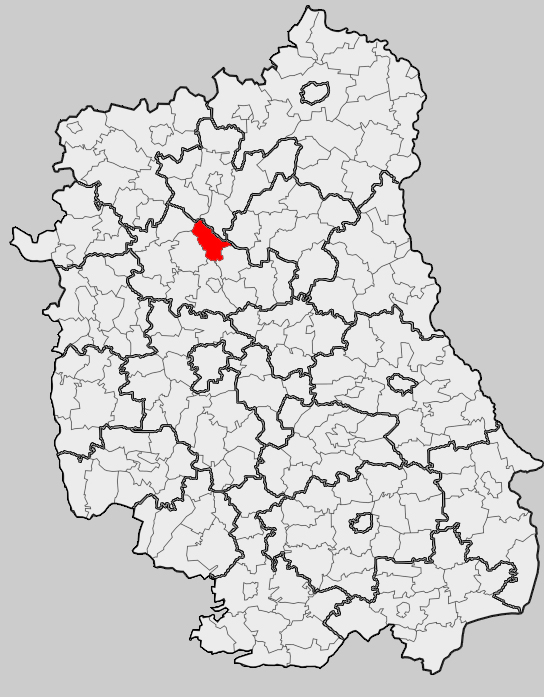
- Location within the county and voivodeship
- Coordinates (Ostrówek): 51°34′47″N 22°36′41″E
- Country: Poland
- Voivodeship: Lublin
- County: Lubartów
- Seat: Ostrówek

Area
  - Total: 89.99 km^{2} (34.75 sq mi)

Population (2015)
  - Total: 3,976
  - Density: 44.18/km^{2} (114.4/sq mi)
- Website: http://www.ostrowek.lubelskie.pl

Gmina Ostrówek is a rural gmina (administrative district) in Lubartów County, Lublin Voivodeship, in eastern Poland. Its seat is the village of Ostrówek, which lies approximately 13 kilometres (8 mi) north of Lubartów and 37 km (23 mi) north of the regional capital Lublin.

The gmina covers an area of 89.99 square kilometres (34.7 sq mi), and as of 2006 its total population is 4,149 (3,976 in 2015).

== Villages ==
Gmina Ostrówek contains the villages and settlements of Antoniówka, Babczyzna, Cegielnia, Dębica, Dębica-Kolonia, Jeleń, Kamienowola, Leszkowice, Luszawa, Ostrówek, Ostrówek-Kolonia, Tarkawica, Zawada, Żurawiniec and Żurawiniec-Kolonia.

== Neighbouring gminas ==
Gmina Ostrówek is bordered by the gminas of Czemierniki, Firlej, Kock, Lubartów, Niedźwiada and Siemień.
