= Wólka Rozwadowska =

- Village
- Location within Poland
- Coordinates: 51°36′18″N 22°26′43″E
- Country: Poland
- Voivodeship: Lublin
- County: Lubartów
- Gmina: Firlej

Wólka Rozwadowska [ˈvulka rɔzvaˈdɔfska] is a village in the administrative district of Gmina Firlej, within Lubartów County, Lublin Voivodeship, in eastern Poland.
