= Czerwonka-Folwark =

- Village
- Location within Poland
- Coordinates: 52°21′24″N 21°52′14″E
- Country: Poland
- Voivodeship: Masovian
- County: Węgrów
- Gmina: Wierzbno

Czerwonka-Folwark [t͡ʂɛrˈvɔnka ˈfɔlvark] is a village in the administrative district of Gmina Wierzbno, within Węgrów County, Masovian Voivodeship, in east-central Poland.
