= Czerwonka Poleśna =

- Village
- Location within Poland
- Coordinates: 51°31′07″N 22°30′14″E
- Country: Poland
- Voivodeship: Lublin
- County: Lubartów
- Gmina: Firlej

Czerwonka Poleśna [t͡ʂɛrˈvɔnka pɔˈlɛɕna] is a village in the administrative district of Gmina Firlej, within Lubartów County, Lublin Voivodeship, in eastern Poland.
