= Kim Seul-ki =

South Korean footballer (born 1992)

Personal information
- Full name: Kim Seul-ki
- Date of birth: 6 November 1992 (age 34)
- Place of birth: South Korea
- Height: 1.74 m (5 ft 8 1/2 in)
- Position: Winger

Team information
- Current team: Gyeongnam FC
- Number: 11

Youth career
- 2011–2013: Jeonju University

Senior career*
| Years | Team | Apps | (Gls) |
| 2014– | Gyeongnam FC | 51 | (1) |
- * Club domestic league appearances and goals as of 1 December 2016

Kim Seul-ki (Korean: 김슬기; born 6 November 1992) is a South Korean footballer who plays as winger for Gyeongnam FC in K League Classic.

== Career ==
He was selected by Gyeongnam FC in the 2014 K League draft.
