= Sobolew, Lublin Voivodeship =

Sobolew
- Village
- Location within Poland
- Coordinates: 51°31′N 22°29′E
- Country: Poland
- Voivodeship: Lublin
- County: Lubartów
- Gmina: Firlej
- Time zone: UTC+1 (CET)
  - Summer (DST): UTC+2 (CEST)

Sobolew [sɔˈbɔlɛf] is a village in the administrative district of Gmina Firlej, within Lubartów County, Lublin Voivodeship, in eastern Poland.

== History ==
Three Polish citizens were murdered by Nazi Germany in the village during World War II.
