= Serock, Lublin Voivodeship =

Serock
- Village
- Location within Poland
- Coordinates: 51°34′N 22°32′E
- Country: Poland
- Voivodeship: Lublin
- County: Lubartów
- Gmina: Firlej
- Postal code: 21-136

Serock [ˈsɛrɔt͡sk] is a village in the administrative district of Gmina Firlej, within Lubartów County, Lublin Voivodeship, in eastern Poland.
