= Lake Firlej =

Lake in Poland

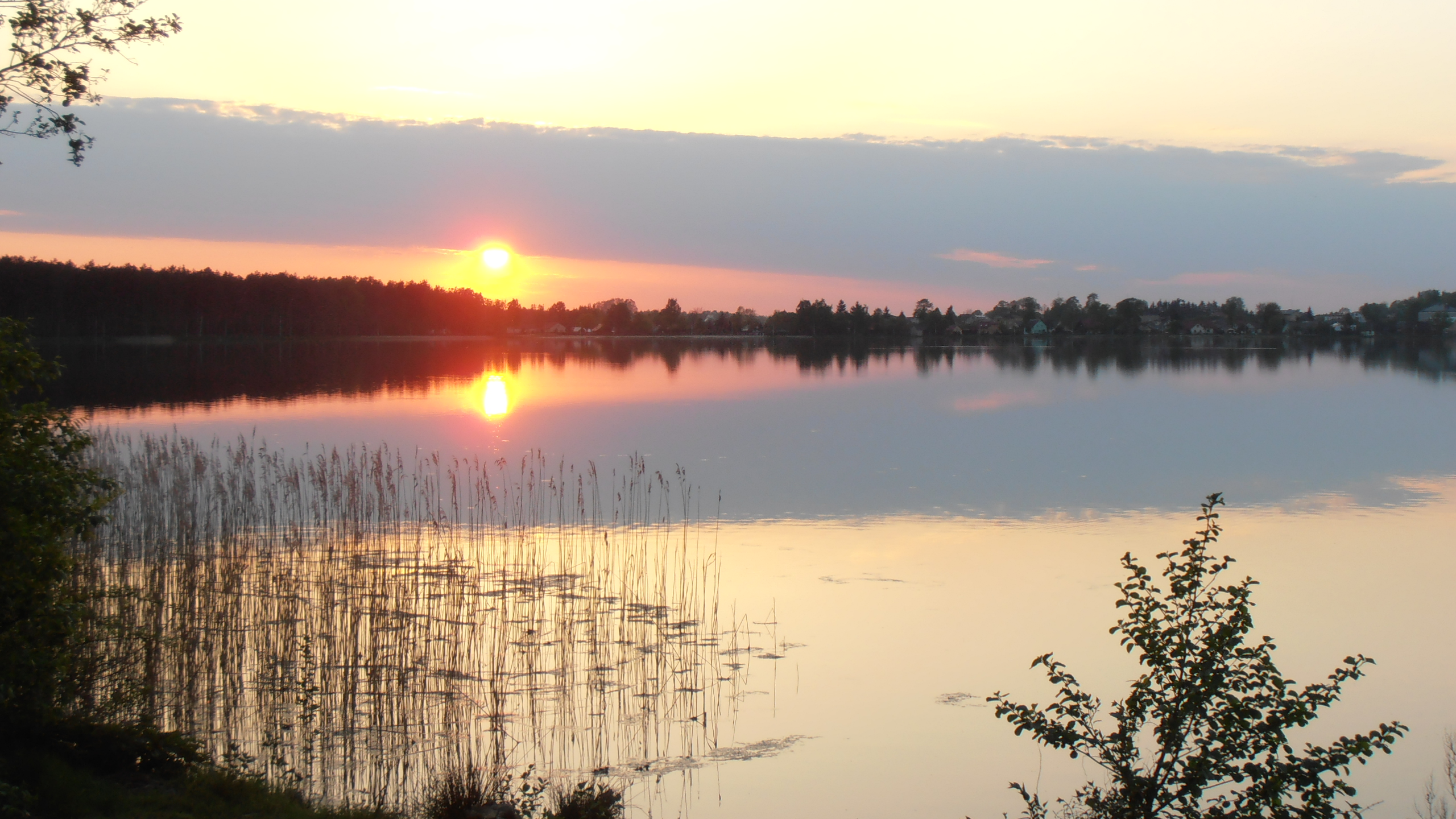

- Location within Lublin Voivodeship
- Location: Lubartów County
- Coordinates: 51°33′13″N 22°30′59″E
- Basin countries: Poland
- Settlements: Firlej

Lake Firlej is a lake in east Poland in Lubartów County near the village of Firlej. The lake has no tributaries and no permanent outlets. The periodic flow only exists after thaws or heavy rains. It flows from its western side and into the lower Kunów Lake.

Around the lake there is an illuminated footpath for pedestrians and a bicycle path. In summer, Lake Firlej is a popular vacation spot. Several sandy beaches are scattered around the lake, Beach on Lake Firlej (Plaża nad jeziorem Firlej) being the largest.

The area around the lake is forested to the south, and more populated on the north side. The village of Firlej is situated on the north-west side of the lake.

Fishing from piers and boats is possible on Lake Firlej. Many species of fish live in the lake, including bream, roach, pike, zander, crucian carp, and eel.

== See also ==
- Kunów Lake
