= Firlej =

- Village
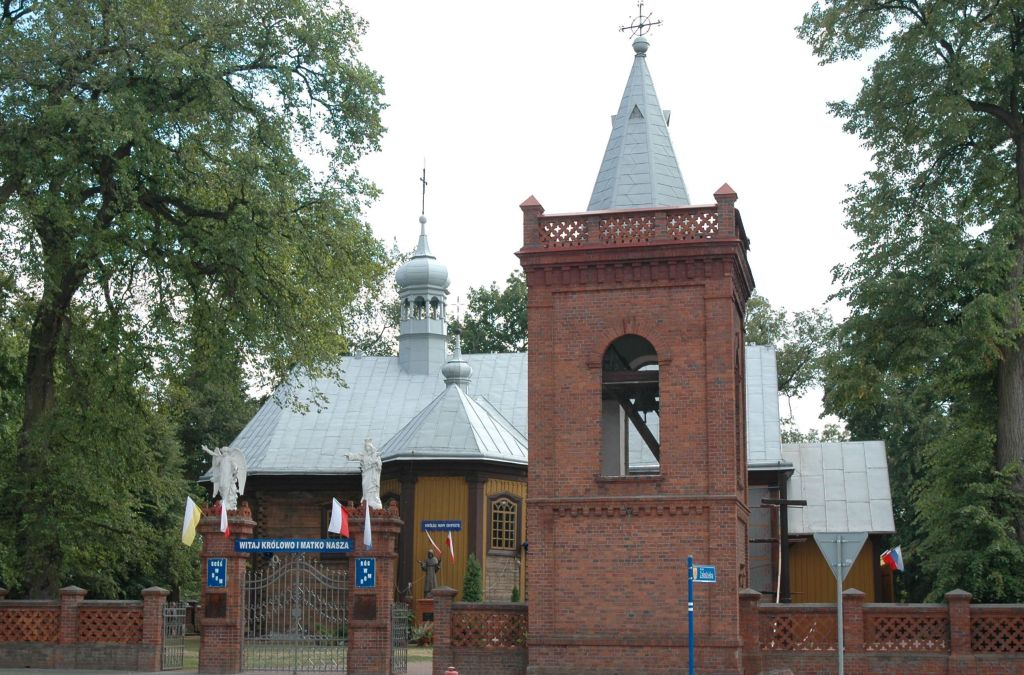
- Church in Firlej

- Location within Poland
- Coordinates: 51°33′29″N 22°30′29″E
- Country: Poland
- Voivodeship: Lublin
- County: Lubartów
- Gmina: Firlej
- Established: 16th century
- Town rights: 1557–1869

Population (2004)
  - Total: 1,000
- Time zone: UTC+1 (CET)
  - Summer (DST): UTC+2 (CEST)
- Vehicle registration: LLB
- Website: http://www.firlej.pl

Firlej [ˈfirlɛi̯] is a village in Lubartów County, Lublin Voivodeship, in eastern Poland. It is the seat of the gmina (administrative district) called Gmina Firlej. It is situated close to Lake Firlej.

In 2004 the village had a population of 1,001.

== History ==
The town Firlej was founded by Mikołaj Firlej in 1557. From the beginning the town has typical agriculture and handicraft character.

The other owners of Firlej were the families of Zalewski, Lubomirski and Sanguszko. In 1839 the town belonged to the president of Bank Polski - Mr Henryk Łubieński, who grounded the first factory of tools and agriculture machines in Lublin area.

After the Third Partition of Poland in 1795, it was annexed by Austria. Following the Austro-Polish War of 1809, it was regained by Poles and included within the short-lived Duchy of Warsaw. After its dissolution in 1815, Firlej passed to the Russian Partition of Poland. Firlej took part in uprising fights in 1831 and in 1863. The town had lost his rights because of patriotism of its citizens in 1869. Battles during World War I brought heavy damage to the town. After the war, in 1918, Poland regained independence and control of Firlej. In the first half of August 1920 in Firlej, marshal Józef Piłsudski inspected the Polish troops going to the east.

During German Nazi occupation Firlej was an area of activity of A.K. division of captain T. Pośpiech. On 8 June 1944, the German gendarmerie, SS and Ukrainian auxiliaries murdered five local Poles, four men and one woman, suspected of resistance activities. The town was liberated on 22 July 1944 by the 27th Home Army Infantry Division.

== Agrotourism ==
The lack of large cities and industry in the area makes development of agrotourism and ecological farm very attractive. The picturesque rivers Wieprz and Tyśmienica, with numerous old basins, make this flat area attractive for recreation, especially water sports. For angling fans there are different sweet water fish like: perch, pike, eel, tench and others.
