= Battle of Kock (1939) =

Final battle of the Nazi invasion of Poland, World War II

Coordinates: 51°38′N 22°26′E

- Part of the Invasion of Poland
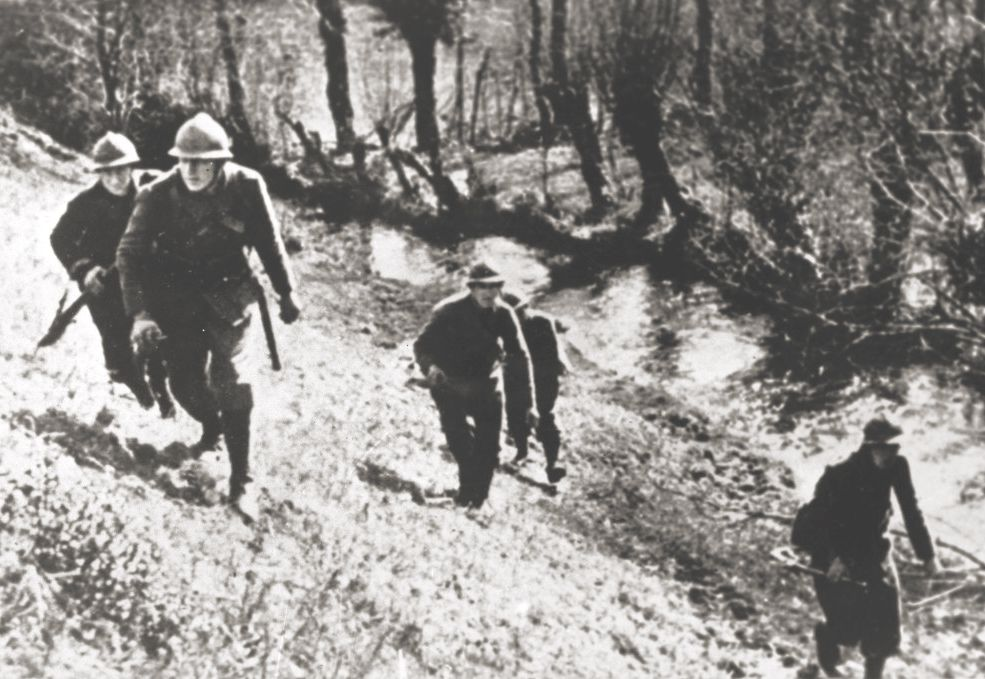
- Polish soldiers during the Battle of Kock
Date	2–5 October 1939 (4 days)
Location	Near Kock, Lublin Voivodeship, Poland
Result	German victory: Polish forces surrender due to lack of ammunition after achieving local success.; Last major regular units of Polish Army surrender, thus ending September Campaign.

Belligerents
Poland	Germany

Commanders and leaders
(Second Polish Republic) Franciszek Kleeberg	(Nazi Germany) G. A. von Wietersheim

Units involved
SGO Polesie	XIV Motorized Corps

Strength
18,000	30,000

Casualties and losses
250–300 casualties 17,000 captured	300–500 casualties 185 captured

The Battle of Kock was the final battle in the invasion of Poland at the beginning of World War II in Europe. It took place from 2 to 5 October 1939, near the town of Kock in Poland. The Independent Operational Group Polesie, led by General Franciszek Kleeberg, fought the German XIV Motorized Corps, which was led by General Gustav Anton von Wietersheim.

== Pre-battle context ==
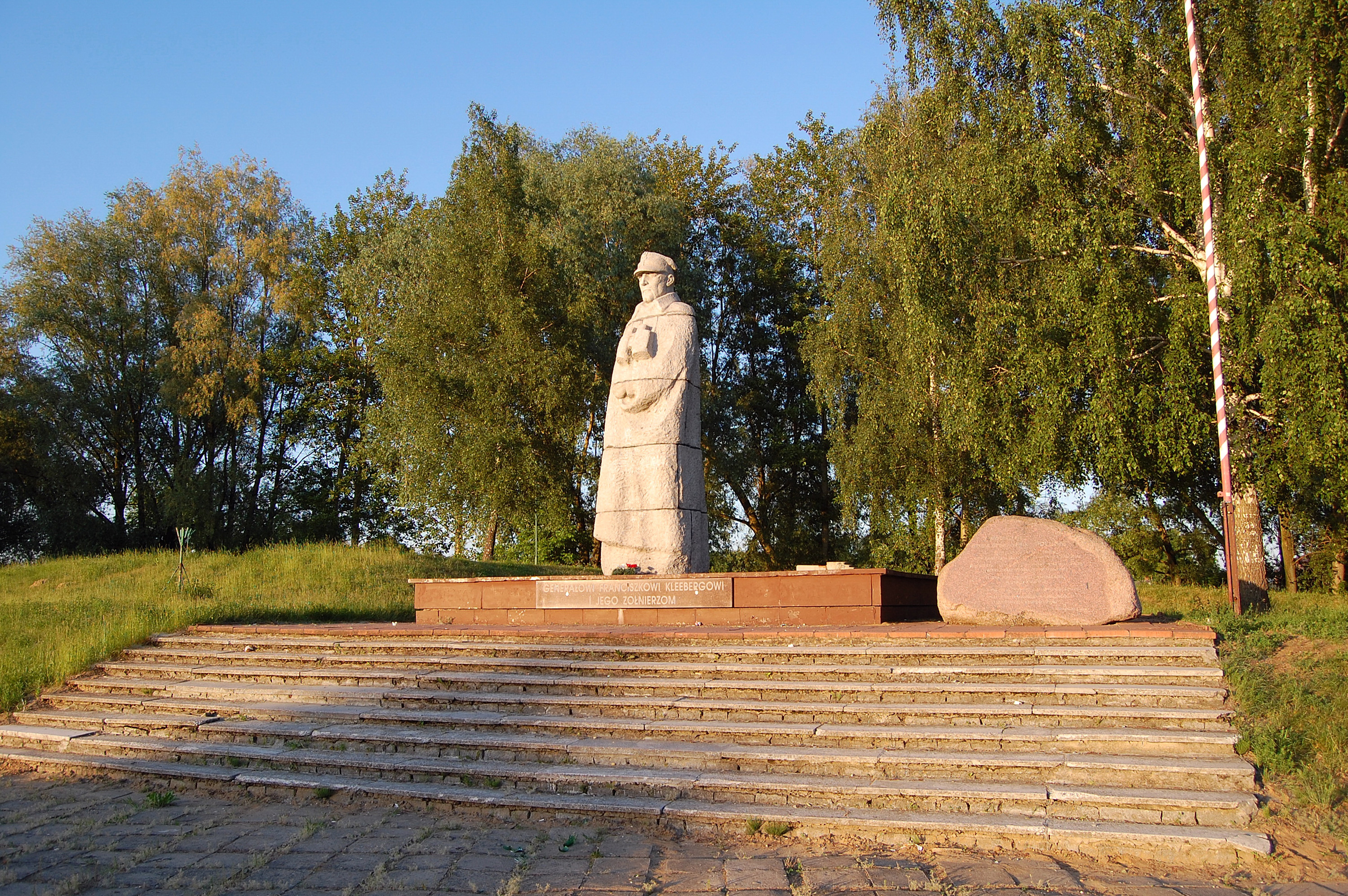
Monument dedicated to General Kleeberg in Kock

Although Polish forces had formed a coherent defensive strategy, rapid German and Soviet advances led to the collapse of the Polish Army's organization. Poland also suffered from a lack of trained officers, leading to many units failing to fully mobilize before the German invasion. Units stationed in Northern Poland, particularly near East Prussia, suffered heavy losses and were forced to retreat south and southeast, in hopes of regrouping and establishing positions along the Vistula and San rivers.

Other units attempted to withdraw towards areas east of the Vistula, such as Lublin and Sandomierz. The rapid German advance, however, often disrupted communications and caused such retreats to be chaotic and fragmented. By the time the Polish forces reached Lublin, their numbers were significantly diminished, limiting their ability to offer effective resistance. Meanwhile, German forces advanced beyond the Vistula, moving in the direction of towns such as Zamość. To the east, Soviet forces had entered Polish territory on September 17, occupying cities such as Volodymyr-Volynskyi.

To the south, the Kraków and Małopolska armies were defeated by the Wehrmacht Army Group South before being able to cross the San River, thus preventing any coordinated defense in the region. During these events, Marshal Edward Rydz-Śmigły served as the Commander-in-Chief of the Polish Armed Forces during the campaign, while General Franciszek Kleeberg, who commanded Army Area IX and later organized the Independent Operational Group Polesie, was responsible for the defense of the eastern front between Pińsk and Brześć.

== Group organization ==
On September 8, 1939, General Kleeberg received orders from Marshal Edward Rydz-Śmigły to organise a division of infantry from the depot division, along with organising a defensive line from Brześć to Pińsk. Although his forces were well trained, they lacked heavy equipment because they had previously been dispatched to the front line.

Independent Operational Group Polesie under General Franciszek Kleeberg
Unit	Polish name	Commander	Composition
60th Infantry Division	60 Dywizja Piechoty "Kobryń"	Col. Adam Epler	7 Infantry (Inf.) battalions (Bns.), an artillery unit, one anti-tank battery
Drohiczyn Poleski Group	Grupa Drohiczyn Poleski	Lt. Col. Kazimierz Gorzkowski	3 Inf. Bns., an anti-tank unit
Jasiołda Group	Grupa Jasiołda		1 Inf. Bn., 1 machine-gun Bn., 1 anti-tank company, 1 unarmed labour Bn.
Brześć Fortress Group	Grupa Forteczna Brześć	Gen. Konstanty Plisowski	3 Inf. Bns., 1 Engineer Bn., 2 Renault FT-17 tank companies, 2 armoured trains, an artillery group
Riverine Flotilla	Flotylla Rzeczna		Several dozen small river motor boats, monitors and artillery ships
8 anti-aircraft batteries			

== Battle of Brześć Litewski and Kobryń ==
After breaking through the Polish line in the Battle of Wizna, the German XIX Army Corps under General Heinz Guderian started rapidly advancing south. The corps, composed of the 3rd Panzer Division, the 10th Panzer Division, and the 20th Motorised Infantry Division with the 2nd Motorised Division in reserve, was ordered to capture Brest Fortress and then strike further south towards Kowel and Galicia. The attack aimed to cut Poland in two and paralyse the defences east of the Bug River.

Guderian's forces advanced almost unopposed until September 14, 1939, when they were stopped in the area of the fortress and Kobryn by a four-battalion-strong improvised force under General Konstanty Plisowski. In the three-day-long battle, known as the Battle of Brześć Litewski, both sides suffered significant casualties. Although the Poles finally withdrew from the area on September 17, 1939, the Germans did not start the pursuit soon enough to rout the retreating Polish Army. The simultaneous attack during the Battle of Kobryń was inconclusive, with the Polish improvised 'Kobryń' Infantry Division under Colonel Adam Epler withdrawing unopposed.

The Podlaska Cavalry Brigade soon joined both Polish units from Kobryń and Brześć. The unit, commanded by General Ludwik Kmicic-Skrzyński, successfully evaded encirclement by withdrawing through the Białowieża Forest. General Kmicic-Skrzyński, accompanied by his chief of staff, Major Julian Szychiewicz, travelled to Vawkavysk, where he established telephone contact with General Kleeberg. The two agreed to join forces and move south toward the Romanian Bridgehead.

The 16th Motorised Infantry Regiment, with artillery and Luftwaffe support, began an attack on the Polish 83rd Infantry Regiment's positions on September 18, 1939, capturing several Polish positions. The Polish counter-attack, beginning at 17:00, regained some territory. General Kleeberg began withdrawing his forces to Romania and Hungary. Over the next two days, Polish forces were ordered to concentrate north of Kowel. While on the march, a formation of the Polesie Group was attacked by saboteurs and from the air, and loose groups of Polish soldiers joined the group.

After a battle with Red Army forces, General Kleeberg decided to march to relieve Warsaw on September 22, 1939. He first planned to capture crossing points on the Bug River. The concentration area would be near Włodawa. The formations, organised by Colonel Brzoza-Brzezina, fought only against the Germans. They could fight the Red Army, but only if the Poles were attacked first. On September 22–25, 1939, elements of the Polesie Group were attacked by German aircraft during the march to Włodawa. On the last day of these attacks, General Kleeberg received information that unknown Polish units had captured Włodawa. Most personnel were soldiers from destroyed Polish formations who had not been captured by the Germans and were seeking commanders and formations that were still fighting. Kleeberg's staff began organising the defence of a bridgehead in Włodawa.

Elsewhere, between September 17, 1939, and September 26, 1939, formations of the Polesie Group crossed the Bug River and entered an area near Włodawa. After learning of Warsaw's surrender, General Kleeberg sought his commanders' opinions and briefed them on the political and military situation. He also asked General Zygmunt Podhorski, the commander of the Cavalry Division Zaza (comprising two cavalry brigades ("Plis" and "Edward"), two infantry battalions ("Olek" and "Wilk") and divisional artillery), to join him. General Podhorski initially agreed but first decided to visit Stawy near Dęblin, the location of the main Polish Army arsenal. They would then move to the Holy Cross Mountains and engage in guerrilla warfare.

Kleeberg decided to reorganise his command. The 'Kobryń' division would not get in the way of resupply and would be renamed the 60th Infantry Division. The 'Brzoza' and 'Drohiczyn' groups would be merged – Colonel Brzoza-Brzezina would command the resultant 50th Infantry Division with 3 infantry regiments (178th, 179th, 180th) and a division of artillery. Colonel Adam Epler would command the 60th Infantry Division, comprising 3 infantry regiments (182nd, 183rd, 184th), a division of artillery, a motorised company of 37 mm anti-tank guns, and eleven independent formations. In all, Kleeberg had about 18,000 men.

On September 28, 1939, the Polish forces began to march south to the Parczew-Wojcieszków line, guarded by the Cavalry Division Zaza. One of the Uhlan regiments from the Cavalry Brigade "Edward" successfully crossed the Wieprz and captured Spiczyn; another cavalry regiment from the Cavalry Division Zaza captured Jawidz and Wymysłów after some resistance. The Germans there suffered heavy losses. The next day, the Cavalry Division Zaza and the Germans fought again near Spiczyn. That evening, the 60th Infantry Division made contact with the Germans and entered a forest near Czeremniki. The Germans, employing an infantry formation supported by two tanks, launched an unsuccessful assault on the 1st Battalion, 182nd Infantry Regiment.

By September 30, 1939, Polish forces were situated between the rivers Tyśmienica and Wieprz. The following day, forces from the 'Polesie' Group passed the Świderki colonies of Bystrzyca, Wola Osowińska, Bełcząc and Ostrówek. The Cavalry Division Zaza had settled in forests near the Tyśmianka River. One squadron of the 2nd Uhlan Regiment, which was defending a road, destroyed a German reconnaissance patrol. The command element of the 5th Uhlan Regiment and the 'Olek' and 'Wilk' infantry battalions attacked the Germans in Kock and captured the town.

== Battle of Kock ==
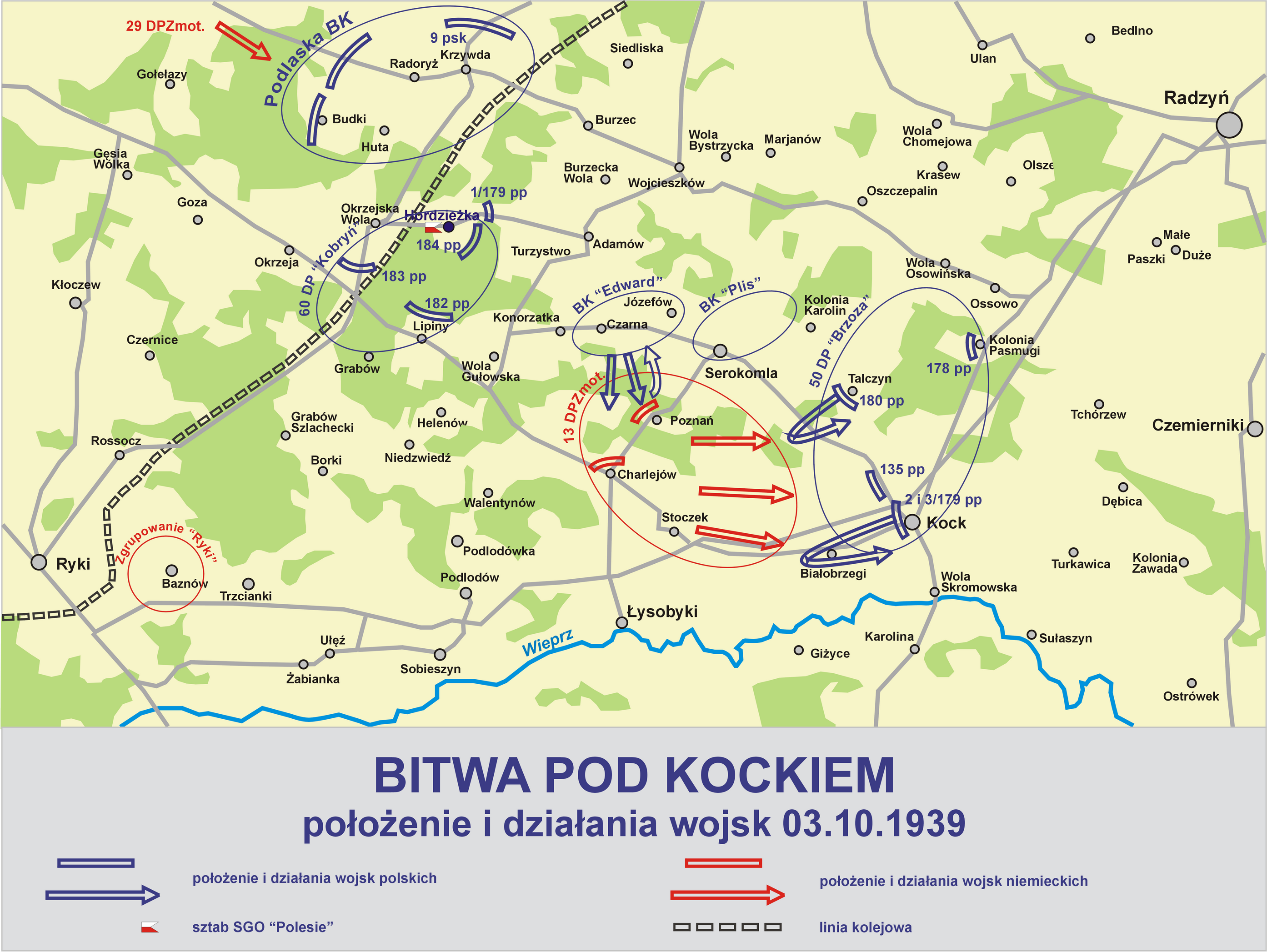

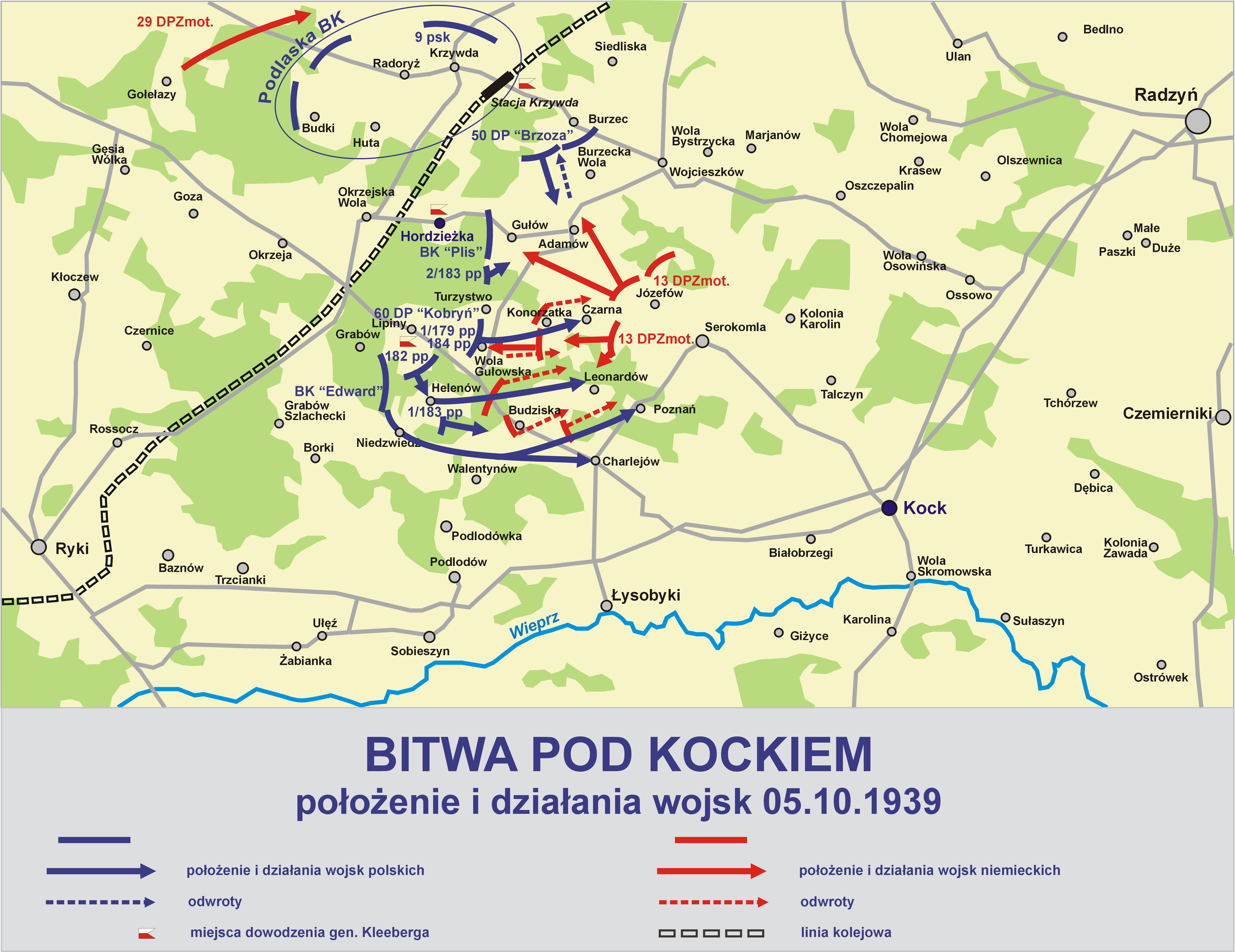

On September 30, Walter von Reichenau, commander of the 10th Army, ordered his staff to attack a large Polish force between the Bug and Vistula rivers. This would involve the XIV Motorised Corps, which comprised the 29th Infantry Division, the 13th Motorised Infantry Division, along with some independent units. Each German motorised division had a reported strength of 16,445 soldiers, 2,676 trucks and staff cars, 1,944 motorcycles, and 18 armoured cars.

=== October 2 ===
General Gustav Anton von Wietersheim, commander of the XIV Motorised Corps, knew Polish forces were in the forests northwest of Kock and believed the Polish commander was unaware of Warsaw's capitulation.

The commander of the 13th Motorised Infantry Division, Generalleutnant Paul Otto, thought that the Polish forces had become so demoralised that they were incapable of combat and that a single German battalion would be enough to disarm and take them as prisoners. General Otto sent a force consisting of the 3rd Battalion, 93rd Motorised Infantry Regiment, supported by the 8th Battery, 13th Light Artillery Regiment. The battalion commander divided his forces into two groups and sent them to Serokomla and Kock. He could count on help from the 93rd Motorised Infantry Regiment, along with some support forces following him.

==== Kock ====
At 08:30 am, a column of half-tracks and truck-mounted infantry came under fire from a guard platoon of No. 2 company of the 'Wilk' battalion. After a protracted engagement, the German troops withdrew. The Polish 179th Infantry Regiment was alerted and moved to defensive positions near and in Kock. At approximately 11:00, German lead elements attacked the Polish positions, now reinforced with two battalions. Despite supporting artillery fire, the attack failed. At dusk, German motorcyclists appeared near the church in Kock and began firing, though they subsequently withdrew upon return fire.

==== Serokomla ====
A motorised infantry company entered the village of Serokomla, leading to a chaotic action between the Germans and Uhlans from the Cavalry Brigade "Plis" (commanded by Colonel Plisowski). An artillery unit from the same brigade supported the Poles. The Germans were forced to withdraw to the south of the village (see October 3, 1939).

==== Casualties ====
The Germans sustained 300–400 casualties. Five officers, 180 NCOs and privates had been briefly captured by the Poles. Components of the Cavalry Brigade "Plis" sustained about 200 casualties.

=== October 3 ===
The stiff Polish resistance forced General Otto to commit all his forces to the assault. He planned to split and encircle the Polish forces. He decided that the 33rd Motorised Infantry Regiment, supported by part of the divisional artillery, would attack Annopol, Pieńki, and Talczyn. This force was tasked with destroying the Polish 50th Infantry Division. The 93rd Motorised Infantry Regiment was ordered to capture Serokomla and then Hordzież and to destroy a defensive formation of the Cavalry Division Zaza. The 66th Motorised Infantry Regiment entered the field of battle in the afternoon.

General Kleeberg correctly thought that the main German advance would be towards the Cavalry Division Zaza at Serokomla/Hordzież. He decided that part of the cavalry would defend against the German attack, and the rest would join a counterattack alongside the 50th Infantry Division on the rear of the 13th German Motorised Infantry Division. The 60th Infantry Division and the Podlaska Cavalry Brigade would close off potential German attack routes. If this counterattack succeeded, the German division would be forced to withdraw behind the Wieprz River.

Between 07:50 am and 09:30 am, the two regiments of the 50th Infantry Division (the 180th and the 178th, less its 2nd Battalion) attacked, supported by a howitzer battery. Lieutenant Colonel Gorzkowski commanded the attack. Initially successful, the Polish units were halted and then forced onto the defensive. The Uhlans' cavalry attack was also stopped and forced to withdraw west of Wola Gułowska.

At 10:30 am, German artillery began to fire on Polish cavalry positions. The 93rd Motorised Infantry Regiment began an attack on the 'Wilk' battalion positions, inflicting heavy losses. The 33rd Motorised Infantry Regiment began a gradual attack on the Polish 50th Infantry Division.

After heavy fighting, the German advance halted. General Otto decided to support the 33rd Motorised Infantry Regiment with the 2nd Battalion of the 66th Motorised Infantry Regiment. German formations captured Wola Gułowska but were forced to retreat east and defend the west.

=== October 4 ===
After the 13th Motorised Infantry Division failed, General von Wietersheim had to use the 29th Motorised Infantry Division. General Otto ordered the 93rd Motorised Infantry Regiment to move from the Wieprz River to Dęblin. The 66th Motorised Infantry Regiment would attack Adamów and Wola Gułowska, and the 33rd Motorised Infantry Regiment would clear the area to the north of Kock.

General Kleeberg suspected the 13th Motorised Infantry Division and the 29th Motorised Infantry Division would launch their main combined attack on Adamów and Krzywda. He thought they could destroy the 13th Motorised Infantry Division, as it had already sustained heavy casualties and material losses. The Cavalry Division Zaza and the 50th Infantry Division would defend their positions, and the 60th Infantry Division would attack the 13th Motorised Infantry Division. The Podlaska Cavalry Brigade would oppose the 29th Motorised Infantry Division.

That morning, the main elements of the 13th Motorised Infantry Division attacked the Cavalry Division Zaza and the 50th Infantry Division. By noon, part of the 66th Motorised Infantry Regiment had captured Zakępie and advanced on Adamów, where the 1st Battalion of the 180th Infantry Regiment halted them.

About 11 hours apart, forces from the 66th Motorised Infantry Regiment attacked the 'Olek' and 'Wilk' battalions defending Czarna, first from the west and then from the east. Artillery fire inflicted heavy casualties on the defenders, and 'Wilk' was forced to withdraw to the eastern edge of the Adamów forest. 'Olek', moving to Adamów, later deployed to Gułów. Between 10:00 and 11:00, formations of the 66th Motorised Infantry Regiment attacked cavalry formations of the 5th Uhlan Regiment, which then withdrew from Wola Gułowska and Adamów southeastward.

At about 12:00, the 66th Motorised Infantry Regiment attacked the 2nd Squadron of the 2nd Uhlan Regiment in Zarzecze, which withdrew with heavy casualties. The regiment commander moved the 4th Squadron south from Helenów to assist the 2nd Squadron, while the 3rd Squadron held the enemy west of Wola Gułowska. The 3rd and 4th Squadrons, with elements of the 10th Uhlan Regiment, fought near the Turzystwo village cemetery and the church in Wola Gułowska. The Poles lost and regained ground repeatedly until an attack by the 2nd Battalion, 184th Infantry Regiment, and the Uhlan Squadron enabled them to dig in.

=== October 5 ===
General von Wietersheim decided to use two of his divisions. They would attempt to encircle and destroy the Polish forces. The 13th Motorised Infantry Division advanced on Bystrzyca and Adamów, then Nowa Wróblina and Stanin; the 29th Motorised Division advanced on Radoryż Kościelny and Nowa Wróblina, where they met troops from the 13th Motorised Infantry Division.

General Kleeberg decided to destroy the 13th Motorised Infantry Division by using forces from the 50th and 60th Infantry Divisions and the Cavalry Division Zaza. The Podlaska Cavalry Brigade defended the position between Radoryż Kościelny and Nowa Wróblina.

==== Fighting in Wojcieszków, Gułów and Adamów ====
The 13th Motorised Infantry Division's artillery began to fire on the 180th Infantry Regiment battalion's positions in Adamów and the 'Olek' Battalion in Gułów at 05:30. Two and a half hours later, the 66th Motorised Infantry Regiment's advance began. After a brief skirmish at 10:00, the Germans captured Adamów; they then attacked the Polish positions on Hill 170 and Gułów, capturing them after intense fighting and suffering heavy losses. The division occupied positions on the eastern edge of the Adamów forest. General Podhorski sent the Cavalry Brigade "Plis" to support them. After contact with the enemy brigade, they attacked the German positions in the forest. They captured the forest and established defensive positions there.

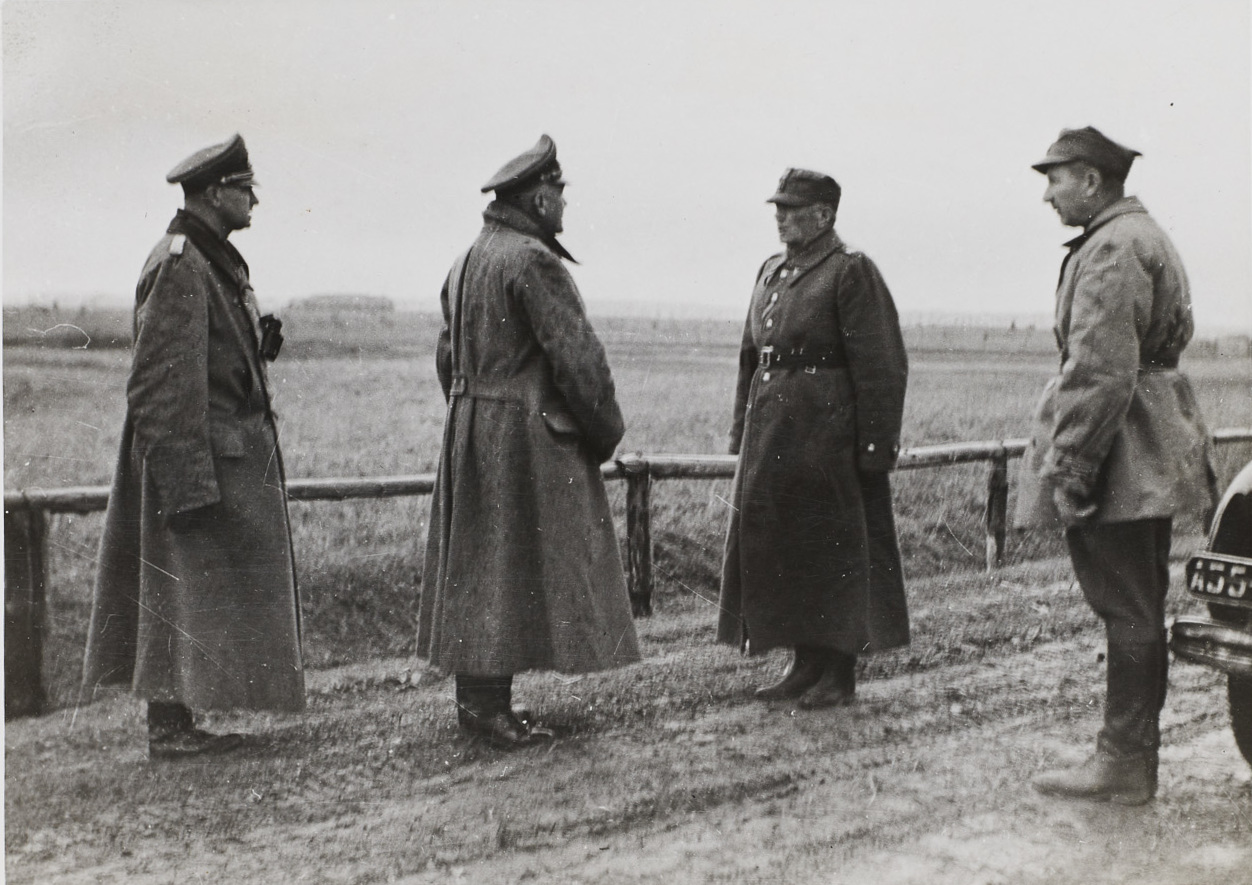
General Franciszek Kleeberg surrenders to Generalleutnant Paul Otto, commander of the 13th Motorized Infantry Division, near Kock

After the capture of Adamów and Gułów Grange by the 66th Motorised Infantry Regiment, the 33rd Motorised Infantry Regiment began to advance, capturing Wojcieszków and Glinne. The Polish 178th Infantry Regiment withdrew. The commander ordered his force to retake Wojcieszków and Glinne, which they successfully achieved, but then withdrew after sustaining heavy losses. The 180th Infantry Regiment's advance on Adamów failed. Colonel Brzoza-Brzezina sent the 178th Infantry Regiment, which soon met the German advance. The 1st Battalion included a part company of sappers. The 2nd and 3rd Battalions took heavy losses and withdrew to Burzec.

Meanwhile, the Polish 184th Infantry Regiment, supported by a battalion of the 179th Infantry Regiment, recaptured the church and cemetery in Wola Gułowska. An advance by the 182nd Infantry Regiment, with the help of three 100mm howitzers, broke the German defence in Helenów.

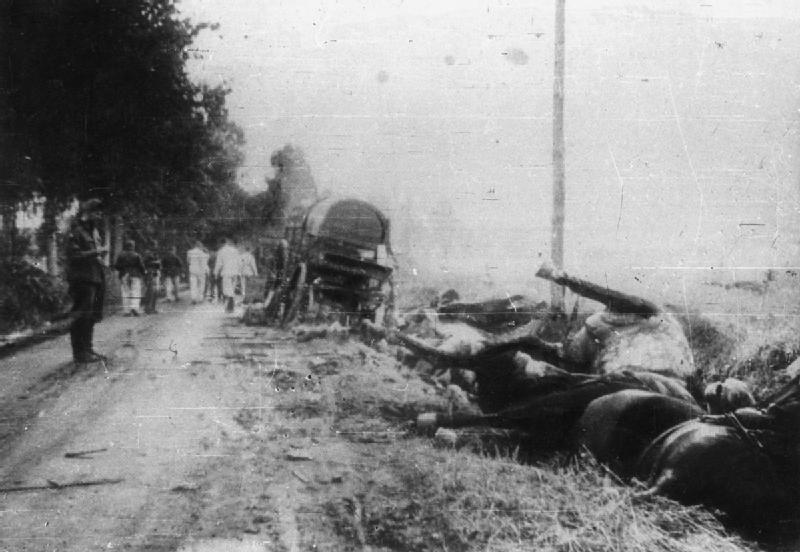
Death and destruction by the roadside at Kock

At 16:00, the last German advance from Adamów began at the positions of the 10th Uhlan Regiment in Krzywda forest, the 182nd Regiment in Helenów, and the 184th Regiment in Wola Gułowska. The 10th Uhlan Regiment withdrew into the forest. Most forces of the 'Brzoza' division successfully defended their positions in Burzec. The 182nd Infantry Regiment held its position. The 184th Regiment withdrew because it lacked artillery ammunition. During this time, two key Polish advances began. The 2nd Battalion of the 183rd Infantry Regiment, with artillery support, began a bayonet assault on the Germans who had attacked the southern wing of the Cavalry Brigade "Plis".

The assault succeeded, and the Germans began to retreat, being chased by infantry and cavalry. The rear of the southern wing of the 13th Motorised Infantry Division was attacked by the Cavalry Brigade "Edward"; they captured the village of Poznań, including a German artillery battery (which had to be destroyed when the cavalry was forced to withdraw due to them coming under fire from another German artillery battery). Elements of the 13th Motorised Infantry Division began to withdraw. One of the last attacks was by the 29th Motorised Division on the Podlaska Cavalry Brigade positions and the rear of the 'Brzoza' Division. After that, both Polish formations withdrew to the south of Krzywda.

At 16:30, General Kleeburg gave his last order in Hordzieżka. Later, as the Hordzieżka forest was being shelled, he returned to his headquarters in Krzywda. At 20:40, Lieutenant Colonels Kazimierz Gorzkowski and Tadeusz Śmigielski left to establish contact with the command staff of the 13th Motorised Infantry Division and the Germans near Adamów. Both sides agreed to a ceasefire lasting until 6 October (the next day) at 06:00, before which time they would conclude a surrender.

The Independent Operational Group Polesie surrendered on 6 October at 10:00. In his last order, General Kleeberg wrote that he capitulated because they were surrounded and had run out of ammunition and food. General Kleeberg's ceremonial surrender took place on 6 October at the Jabłonowskich Palace in Kock.

== See also ==
- List of World War II military equipment of Poland
- List of German military equipment of World War II
