= Januszówka =

Januszówka may refer to the following places:

- Januszówka, Łęczna County in Lublin Voivodeship (east Poland)
- Januszówka, Łuków County in Lublin Voivodeship (east Poland)
- Januszówka, Masovian Voivodeship (east-central Poland)
- Januszówka, Greater Poland Voivodeship (west-central Poland)
