= Władysław Król =

Polish ice hockey and football player and coach (1907–1991)

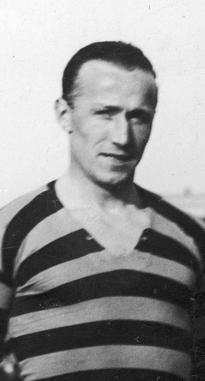

Personal information
- Date of birth: 30 October 1907
- Place of birth: Kijany, Russian Empire
- Date of death: 29 January 1991 (aged 83)
- Place of death: Łódź, Poland
- Height: 1.75 m (5 ft 9 in)
- Position: Forward

Senior career*
Years	Team	Apps	(Gls)
- WKS Nałęczów
1924–1926	Lublinianka		
1927	Unia Lublin		
1928–1946	ŁKS Łódź		

International career
1933–1937	Poland	4	(2)

Managerial career
- 1939: ŁKS Łódź (player-manager)
- 1945–1946: ŁKS Łódź (player-manager)
- 1948–1949: ŁKS Łódź
- 1950–1951: Włókniarz-Widzew Łódź
- 1952–1959: ŁKS-Włókniarz Łódź
- 1963–1964: ŁKS Łódź
- 1965–1966: ŁKS Łódź
- * Club domestic league appearances and goals

Władysław Król
- Born: 30 October 1907 Kijany, Russian Empire
- Died: 29 January 1991 (aged 83) Łódź, Poland
- Position: Left wing
- Played for: ŁKS Łódź
- National team: Poland
- Playing career: 1929–1951

Władysław Król (30 October 1907 – 29 January 1991) was a Polish ice hockey and football player and coach. He played for ŁKS Łódź in both sports during his career. Internationally, he played four games for the Poland national football team, and with the Poland national ice hockey team at the 1936 Winter Olympics, as well as the 1938 World Championship. After his playing career, he turned to coaching, remaining with the ŁKS Łódź football club, whom he managed at various times from 1939 until 1966.

Since 2021, he has been the patron of the ŁKS Łódź Municipal Stadium.

== Honours ==
=== Football manager ===
ŁKS Łódź

- Ekstraklasa: 1958
- Polish Cup: 1956–57
