= 10th Lithuanian Uhlan Regiment =

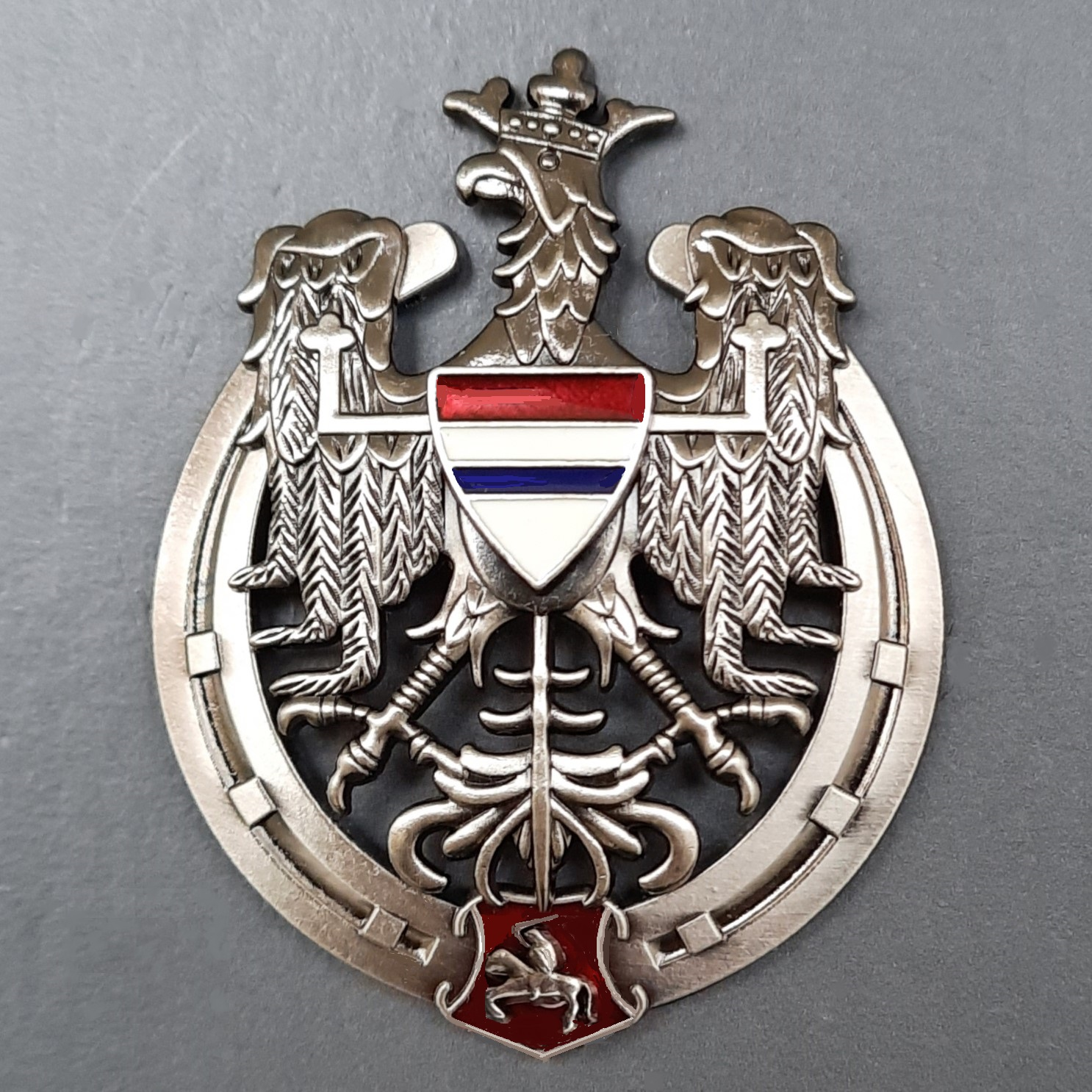
- Active: 9 December 1918 – 6 October 1939; 1943–1945
- Country: Poland
- Branch: 1st Lithuanian–Belarusian Division (1918–1921); Podlaska Cavalry Brigade (1937–1939); Home Army (1944–1945)
- Type: Uhlan
- Role: Cavalry
- Anniversaries: 8 May
- Engagements: Polish-Soviet War: Kiev offensive (1920); Battle of the Niemen River; World War II: Invasion of Poland; Battle of Kock; Operation Tempest

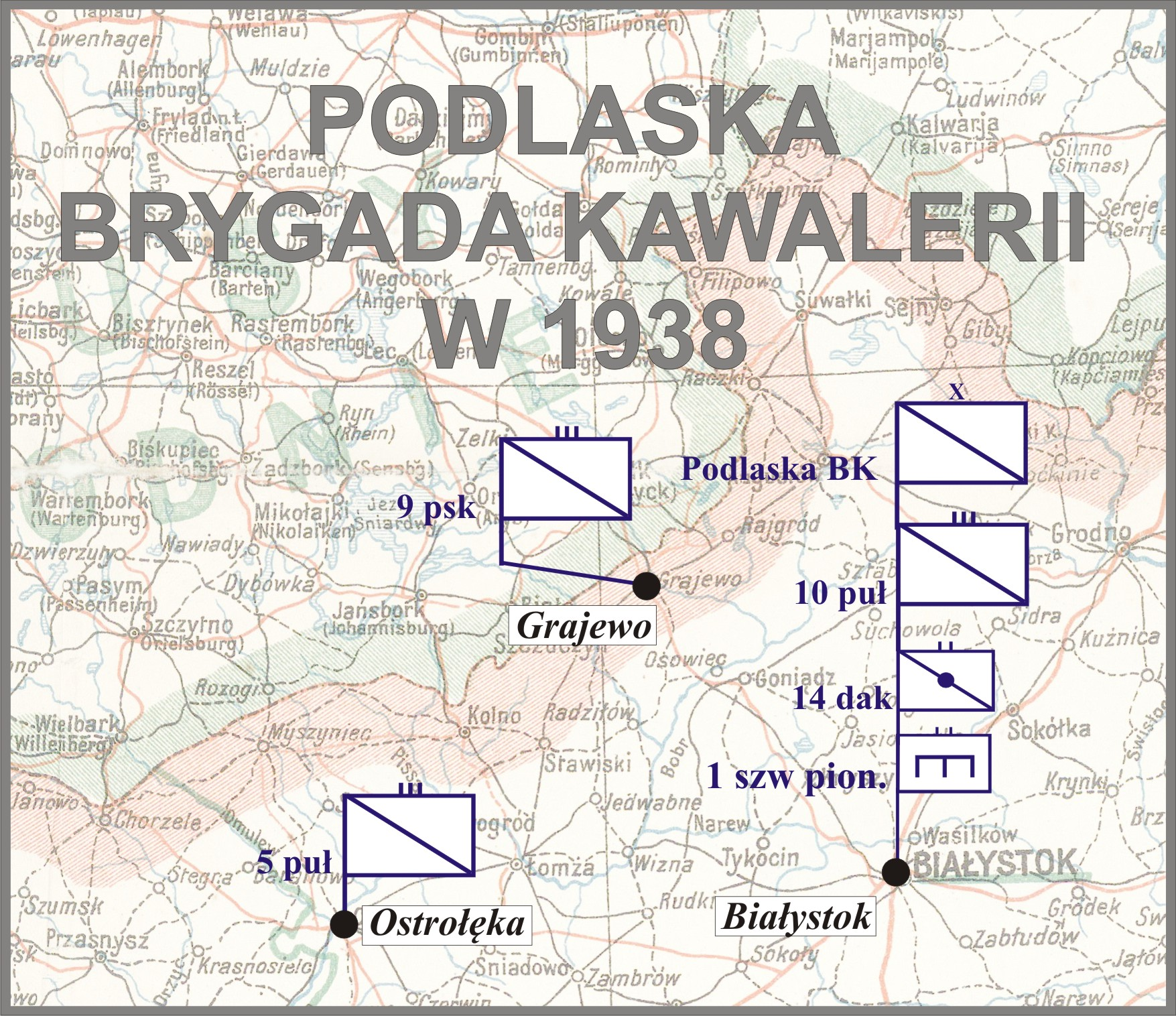
Podlaska BK in 1938

10th Lithuanian Uhlan Regiment (Polish: 10. Pułk Ułanów Litewskich, 10 puł) was a cavalry unit of the Polish Army in the Second Polish Republic. From 1922 until 1939, it was garrisoned in Białystok. The regiment was created as part of the so-called Lithuanian and Belarusian Self-Defence. Also, in 1920–1922, it belonged to the armed forces of the Republic of Central Lithuania. During the Invasion of Poland, it was part of Podlaska Cavalry Brigade.

== Formation ==
On December 9, 1918, in the village of Pietkowo near Lapy, officers of the 1st Lithuanian–Belarusian Division formed the 1st Uhlan Regiment, whose name was on December 30 changed into 10th Uhlan Regiment. Most of the officers and soldiers of the new unit were born and raised in the lands of the former Grand Duchy of Lithuania. The uniforms and weapons were German, seized from the barracks of the Ober Ost, but at the beginning, the regiment lacked horses.

== Polish-Soviet War ==
By the summer of 1919, squadrons of the brigade were sent to the eastern front, to reinforce the Lithuanian–Belarusian Division in the ongoing Polish-Soviet War. The regiment fought in the territory of current Belarus, advancing from Baranowicze towards Minsk and Bobrujsk. In September 1919, the regiment was incorporated into 2nd Cavalry Brigade of the Polish Army. In the winter of 1919/1920, and early spring 1920, it fought in Polesie, around Mozyr. In May, during the Kiev offensive (1920), the regiment was ordered to reach the Dniepr river, which was achieved on May 8. After the Soviet counteroffensive, Polish forces withdrew, with the uhlans covering the infantry.

On August 6, 1920, the regiment reached Siedlce, and for the remaining part of the month was engaged in heavy fighting against the advancing enemy. In September it fought with distinction in the Battle of the Niemen River.

After the armistice of October 19, 1920, the regiment was located in the area of Dokszyce, where its flag, funded by Countess Julia Potocka, was handed to the officers in a parish church at the village of Parafianowo (November 4, 1920). For the remaining part of 1920 and 1921, the regiment was officially part of the armed forces of the Republic of Central Lithuania. It remained in the area of Braslaw until September 1922.

== Second Polish Republic ==
In September 1922, 10th Uhlan Regiment was moved to Białystok, where it remained until 1939. It was considered an elite cavalry unit, with officers from Finland and Sweden training there. Since 1925, 1st Squadron of Armoured Vehicles was attached to the regiment, and in 1932, a training squadron (Szwadron Krakusow) was formed in Wysokie Mazowieckie.

== 1939 Invasion of Poland ==
On August 25, 1939, the regiment left its barracks, and marched towards its positions near the border with East Prussia. As part of Podlaska Cavalry Brigade (Independent Operational Group Narew), it defended hills around the village of Olszewo-Gora. On September 2–4, the regiment took part in a cavalry raid on East Prussia, after which it retreated to Poland. On September 9, it attacked the enemy in the town of Brok, after which it took part in a number of skirmishes. By September 18, the regiment was located in Bialowieza Forest, where it joined Suwalska Cavalry Brigade. On September 20 it was stationed in Bialowieza, and three days later it destroyed a Soviet military transport train near Nurzec. In the night of September 24/25, the uhlans crossed the Bug river near Mielnik, and in early October, it fought near Serokomla. The regiment capitulated to the Germans on October 6, 1939.

== Home Army ==
In 1943, Białystok District of the Home Army recreated the 10th Lithuanian Uhlan Regiment. The unit was trained to seize the city of Białystok during the Operation Tempest, but failed to do so, due to German terror and rapid advance of the Red Army in the summer of 1944 (see Operation Bagration). Nevertheless, the regiment fought in several skirmishes, destroying two German military trains.

== Commandants ==
- Colonel Wladyslaw Obuch-Woszczatynski (1918–1920)
- Colonel Walerian Jachimowicz (1920)
- Colonel Seweryn Grabowski (1920–1921)
- Colonel Terencjusz O’Brien de Lacy (1921–1928)
- Colonel Witoslaw Porczynski (29 I 1929 - II 1938)
- Colonel Kazimierz Busler (1938–1939)
- Major Marian Walter "Zadora" (1944)

== Symbols ==
The regiment received its flag on November 4, 1920. It was founded by Countess Julia Potocka. Regimental badge was accepted by military authorities on January 26, 1926. It featured a silver Jagiellonian Eagle with a horseshoe and Lithuanian coat of arms, the Pahonia.

The regiment had its own zurawiejka, and it celebrated its holiday on May 8, the anniversary of the 1920 reaching the line of the Dniepr river.

== See also ==
- Polish cavalry

== Sources ==
- Kazimierz Satora: Opowieści wrześniowych sztandarów. Warsaw: Instytut Wydawniczy Pax, 1990. ISBN 83-211-1104-1.
- Henryk Smaczny: Księga kawalerii polskiej 1914-1947: rodowody, barwa, broń. Warsaw: TESCO, 1989.
