= Ludwików =

Ludwików may refer to the following places:

- Ludwików, Bełchatów County in Łódź Voivodeship (central Poland)
- Ludwików, Piotrków County in Łódź Voivodeship (central Poland)
- Ludwików, Radomsko County in Łódź Voivodeship (central Poland)
- Ludwików, Skierniewice County in Łódź Voivodeship (central Poland)
- Ludwików, Łęczna County in Lublin Voivodeship (east Poland)
- Ludwików, Gmina Opole Lubelskie in Opole County, Lublin Voivodeship (east Poland)
- Ludwików, Białobrzegi County in Masovian Voivodeship (east-central Poland)
- Ludwików, Grójec County in Masovian Voivodeship (east-central Poland)
- Ludwików, Lipsko County in Masovian Voivodeship (east-central Poland)
- Ludwików, Piaseczno County in Masovian Voivodeship (east-central Poland)
- Ludwików, Gmina Gąbin in Masovian Voivodeship (east-central Poland)
- Ludwików, Gmina Łąck in Masovian Voivodeship (east-central Poland)
- Ludwików, Radom County in Masovian Voivodeship (east-central Poland)
- Ludwików, Gmina Rybno in Masovian Voivodeship (east-central Poland)
- Ludwików, Gmina Teresin in Masovian Voivodeship (east-central Poland)
- Ludwików, Konin County in Greater Poland Voivodeship (west-central Poland)
- Ludwików, Gmina Przygodzice, Ostrów County in Greater Poland Voivodeship (west-central Poland)
