= Marceli Porowski =

Polish government official

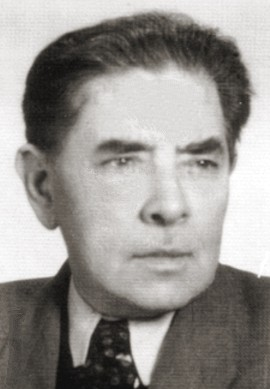
- Marceli Porowski c. 1941

Mayor of Warsaw
- In office 5 August 1944 – 2 October 1944
- Preceded by: Julian Kulski
- Succeeded by: Marian Spychalski

Personal details
- Born: 4 February 1894 Wola Bystrzycka, Congress Poland, Russian Empire (now part of Poland)
- Died: 22 October 1963 (aged 69) Warsaw, Poland
- Education: Peter the Great St. Petersburg Polytechnic University

Marceli Porowski (Polish: [marˈt͡sɛ.li pɔˈrɔv.ski]; 4 February 1894 – 21 October 1963) was a Polish government official. From 5 August 1944 to 2 October 1944, he was the mayor of Warsaw, in an area controlled by the partisants during the Warsaw Uprising.

== Biography ==
Marceli Porowski was born on 4 February 1894, in Wola Bystrzycka, Congress Poland, Russian Empire. He was a son of Marceli Porkowski and Helena Porkowska. His father died from typhus before he was born.

Marceli has attended to gymnasiums in Biała Podlaska and Suwałki, and graduated in 1911. From 1912 to 1918, he studied economics at the Peter the Great St. Petersburg Polytechnic University.

From May 1919 to 1929, he worked in the Department of the Local Government of the Ministry of Interior in Warsaw, where among other functions, he was the head of the Municipal Finance Division. Around that time, he was also the starosta (mayor) of Skierniewice for 10 months. On 7 December 1920, he married Halina Mościcka.

From 1 September 1929, he was the director of the office of the Polish Towns Association, and following the change of the organization by-laws in 1931, its director until September 1939. From 1930, he edited Samorząd Miejski, which was the organization press publication. From 1935, he was the deputy director of the General Council of the International Cities Association.

On 16 September 1939, during the Siege of Warsaw laid by the German forces, Porowski was appointed by Stefan Starzyński, the Civil Commissioner of the Warsaw Defence Command, to be the representative of the District Commissioner Office of Praga-South.

Under the German occupation, he worked in the City Administration of Warsaw. From 1941, he was a representative of Warsaw in the Government Delegation for Poland of the Polish government-in-exile. Shortly after the beginning of the Warsaw Uprising, on 5 August 1944, Porowski was appointed the mayor and government commissioner of Warsaw in the area controlled by the partisans. He was originally seated in Old Town, and on 26 August 1944, he moved via the underground tunnels, to Downtown, where his government remained seated until the end of the uprising. During the war, he used alliances Sowa, Mazowiecki, and Wolski. He remained in office until the capitulation of the uprising forces on 2 October 1944. On 7 October 1944, he left the city with the civilian population.

Following the end of the Second World War, Porowski returned to working in the state administration. Among other functions, he was the head of the Department of the Local Government of the Ministry of Public Administration. In March 1947, he was demoted to the General Inspector of the Public Administration, and in January 1949, moved to the position of the deputy director of the Central Administration of the Ministry of Public Administration. In May 1950, he was again demoted to the lowel lovel position in the Ministry of Municipal Economy.

In June 1950, he was fired from the Ministry of Municipal Economy, and begun working in the Central Administration of the Project Offices of the Municipal Construction in Warsaw, and later, he worked as the senior inspector in the Kraków branch. He retired in September 1951.

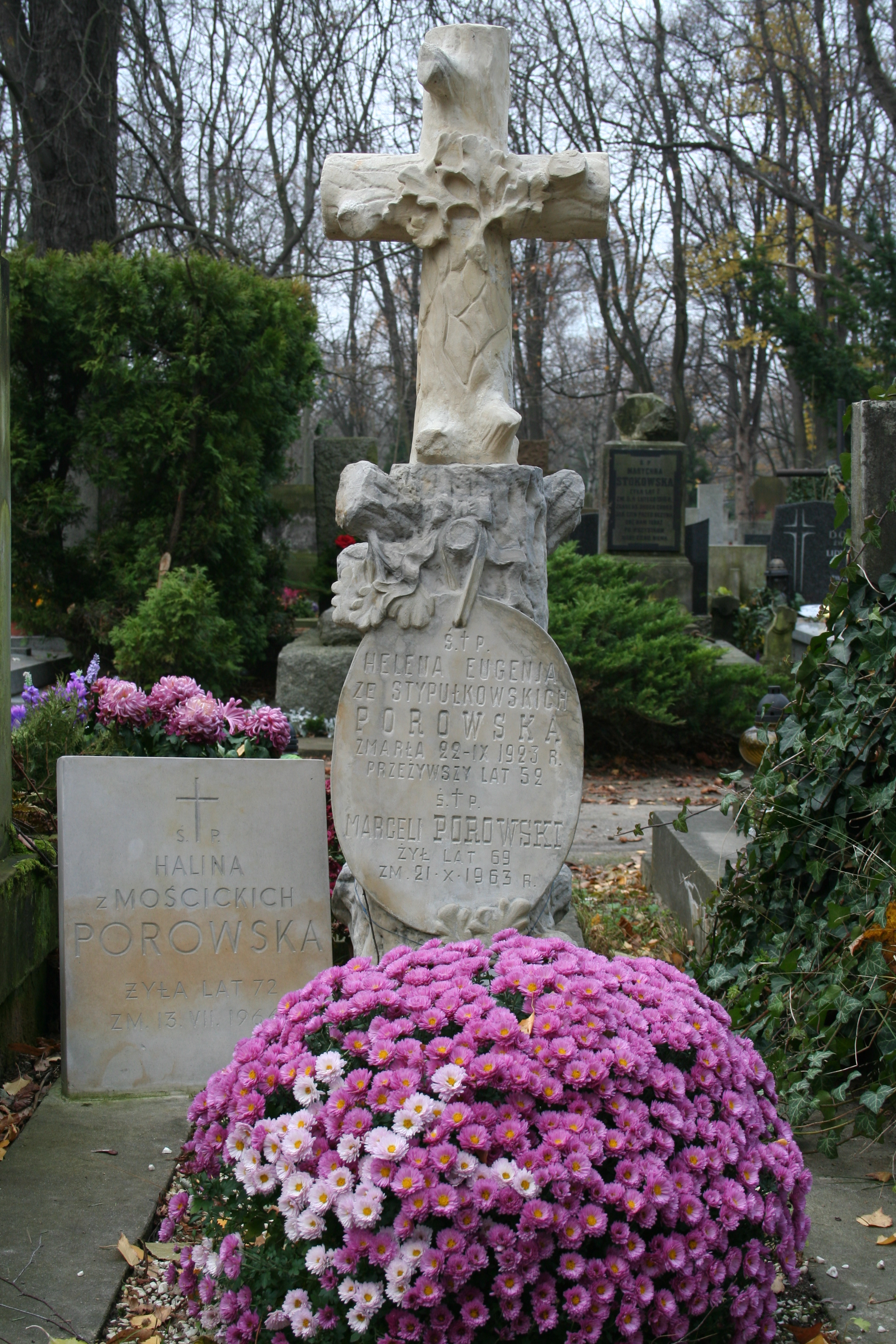
The grave of Porowski in Powązki Cemetery, Warsaw, in 2012

On 8 December 1951, Porowski was arrested for his activity during the war, and on 10 February 1953, he received the death sentence. In May 1955, he was released from prison, and in 1957, he was rehabilitated.

Porowski died on 21 October 1963 in Warsaw, Poland. He was buried at the Powązki Cemetery in Warsaw, in the grave no. 221-5-14.

== Legacy and commemoration ==
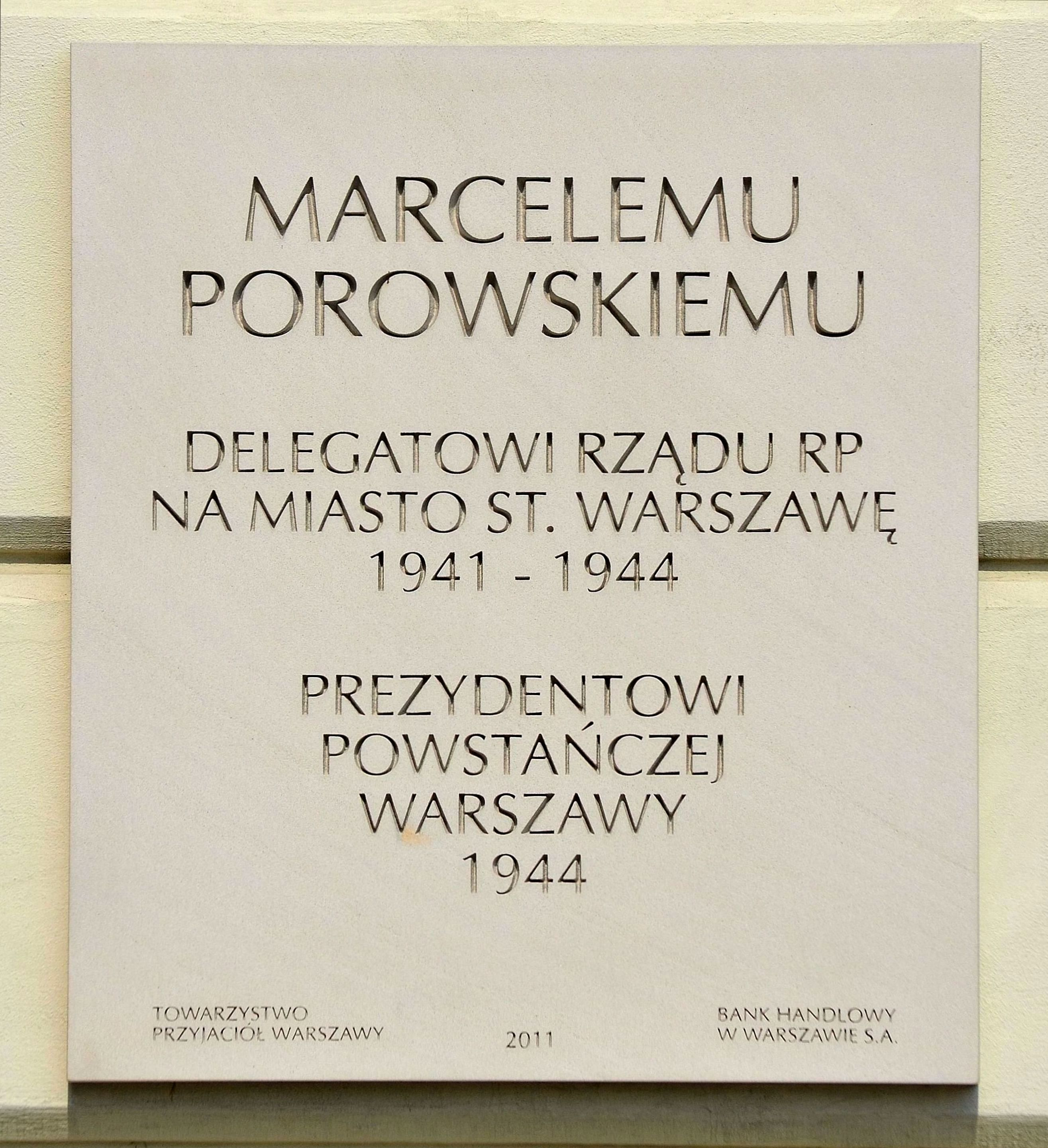
The commemorative plaque dedicated to Porowski, on the façade of Jabłonowski Palace, Warsaw

On 2 August 2010, Jadwiga Porowska, Marceli Porowski's daughter-in-law, handed over his documents to Ryszard Wojtkowski, the director of the Warsaw National Archives. Among the document, there were his diary notes from the time of German occupation and Warsaw Uprising, the death sentence documents, prison mail, and articles wrote after he was realised from the prison.

On 6 October 2010 was released the book about Porowski, titled Marceli Porowski. Prezydent Powstańczej Warszawy (Marceli Porowski. Mayor of Warsaw during the Uprising), written by historian Marian Marek Drozdowski.

On 10 November 2010, Porowski was posthumously awarded the Commander's Cross of the Order of Polonia Restituta.

On 16 November 2011, on the façade of the Jabłonowski Palace, former city hall of Warsaw, was placed the commemorative plaque dedicated to Marceli Porowski.

== Orders and decorations ==
- Gold Cross of Merit (11 January 1928)
- Medal for the 10th Anniversary of Regaining Independence (27 September 1928)
- Commander's Cross of the Order of Polonia Restituta (10 November 2010; posthumously)
