= Wólka, Łuków County =

Wólka
- Village
- Location within Poland
- Coordinates: 51°42′13″N 22°21′35″E
- Country: Poland
- Voivodeship: Lublin
- County: Łuków
- Gmina: Serokomla

Wólka [ˈvulka] is a village in the administrative district of Gmina Serokomla, within Łuków County, Lublin Voivodeship, in eastern Poland.
