= Wola Bobrowa =

- Village
- Location within Poland
- Coordinates: 51°46′N 22°21′E
- Country: Poland
- Voivodeship: Lublin
- County: Łuków
- Gmina: Wojcieszków
- Population: 220

Wola Bobrowa [ˈvɔla bɔˈbrɔva] is a village in the administrative district of Gmina Wojcieszków, within Łuków County, Lublin Voivodeship, in eastern Poland.
