= Nowy Radzic =

- Village
- Location within Poland
- Coordinates: 51°23′06″N 22°47′48″E
- Country: Poland
- Voivodeship: Lublin
- County: Łęczna
- Gmina: Spiczyn

Nowy Radzic [ˈnɔvɨ ˈrad͡ʑit͡s] is a village in the administrative district of Gmina Spiczyn, within Łęczna County, Lublin Voivodeship, in eastern Poland.
