= Nowa Ruda, Lublin Voivodeship =

Nowa Ruda
- Village
- Location within Poland
- Coordinates: 51°41′3″N 22°22′48″E
- Country: Poland
- Voivodeship: Lublin
- County: Łuków
- Gmina: Serokomla
- Population: 140

Nowa Ruda [ˈnɔva ˈruda] is a village in the administrative district of Gmina Serokomla, within Łuków County, Lublin Voivodeship, in eastern Poland.
