= Otylin =

- Village
- Location within Poland
- Coordinates: 51°47′20″N 22°20′28″E
- Country: Poland
- Voivodeship: Lublin
- County: Łuków
- Gmina: Wojcieszków

Otylin [ɔˈtɨlin] is a village in the administrative district of Gmina Wojcieszków, within Łuków County, Lublin Voivodeship, in eastern Poland.
