= Leonardów, Lublin Voivodeship =

Leonardów
- Village
- Location within Poland
- Coordinates: 51°42′N 22°17′E
- Country: Poland
- Voivodeship: Lublin
- County: Łuków
- Gmina: Serokomla
- Time zone: UTC+1 (CET)
  - Summer (DST): UTC+2 (CEST)

Leonardów [lɛɔˈnarduf] is a village in the administrative district of Gmina Serokomla, within Łuków County, Lublin Voivodeship, in eastern Poland.

== History ==
Four Polish citizens were murdered by Nazi Germany in the village during World War II.
