= Nowa Wólka =

- Village
- Location within Poland
- Coordinates: 51°21′46″N 22°48′00″E
- Country: Poland
- Voivodeship: Lublin
- County: Łęczna
- Gmina: Spiczyn

Nowa Wólka [ˈnɔva ˈvulka] is a village in the administrative district of Gmina Spiczyn, within Łęczna County, Lublin Voivodeship, in eastern Poland.
