= Charlejów =

- Village
- Location within Poland
- Coordinates: 51°40′N 22°17′E
- Country: Poland
- Voivodeship: Lublin
- County: Łuków
- Gmina: Serokomla

Charlejów [xarˈlɛjuf] is a village in the administrative district of Gmina Serokomla, within Łuków County, Lublin Voivodeship, in eastern Poland.
