= Bielany Duże =

- Village
- Location within Poland
- Coordinates: 51°42′45″N 22°17′16″E
- Country: Poland
- Voivodeship: Lublin
- County: Łuków
- Gmina: Serokomla

Bielany Duże [bjɛˈlanɨ ˈduʐɛ] is a village in the administrative district of Gmina Serokomla, within Łuków County, Lublin Voivodeship, in eastern Poland.
