= Gmina Wojcieszków =

Gmina Wojcieszków Wojcieszków Commune
- Gmina
- Flag Coat of arms
- Interactive map of Gmina Wojcieszków
- Coordinates (Wojcieszków): 51°46′N 22°19′E
- Country: Poland
- Voivodeship: Lublin
- County: Łuków
- Seat: Wojcieszków

Area
  - Total: 108.61 km^{2} (41.93 sq mi)

Population (2006)
  - Total: 7,005
  - Density: 64.50/km^{2} (167.0/sq mi)
- Website: http://www.wojcieszkow.pl

Gmina Wojcieszków is a rural gmina (administrative district) in Łuków County, Lublin Voivodeship, in eastern Poland. Its seat is the village of Wojcieszków, which lies approximately 18 kilometres (11 mi) south of Łuków and 61 km (38 mi) north of the regional capital Lublin.

The gmina covers an area of 108.61 square kilometres (41.9 sq mi), and as of 2006 its total population is 7,005.

== Villages ==
Gmina Wojcieszków contains the villages and settlements of Burzec, Bystrzyca, Ciężkie, Helenów, Hermanów, Kolonia Bystrzycka, Marianów, Nowinki, Oszczepalin Drugi, Oszczepalin Pierwszy, Otylin, Siedliska, Świderki, Wojcieszków, Wola Bobrowa, Wola Burzecka, Wola Bystrzycka, Wólka Domaszewska, Zofibór and Zofijówka.

== Neighbouring gminas ==
Gmina Wojcieszków is bordered by the gminas of Adamów, Borki, Krzywda, Łuków, Serokomla, Stanin and Ulan-Majorat.
