= Marian Spychalski =

Polish architect, military commander, and politician

Marshal Marian Spychalski
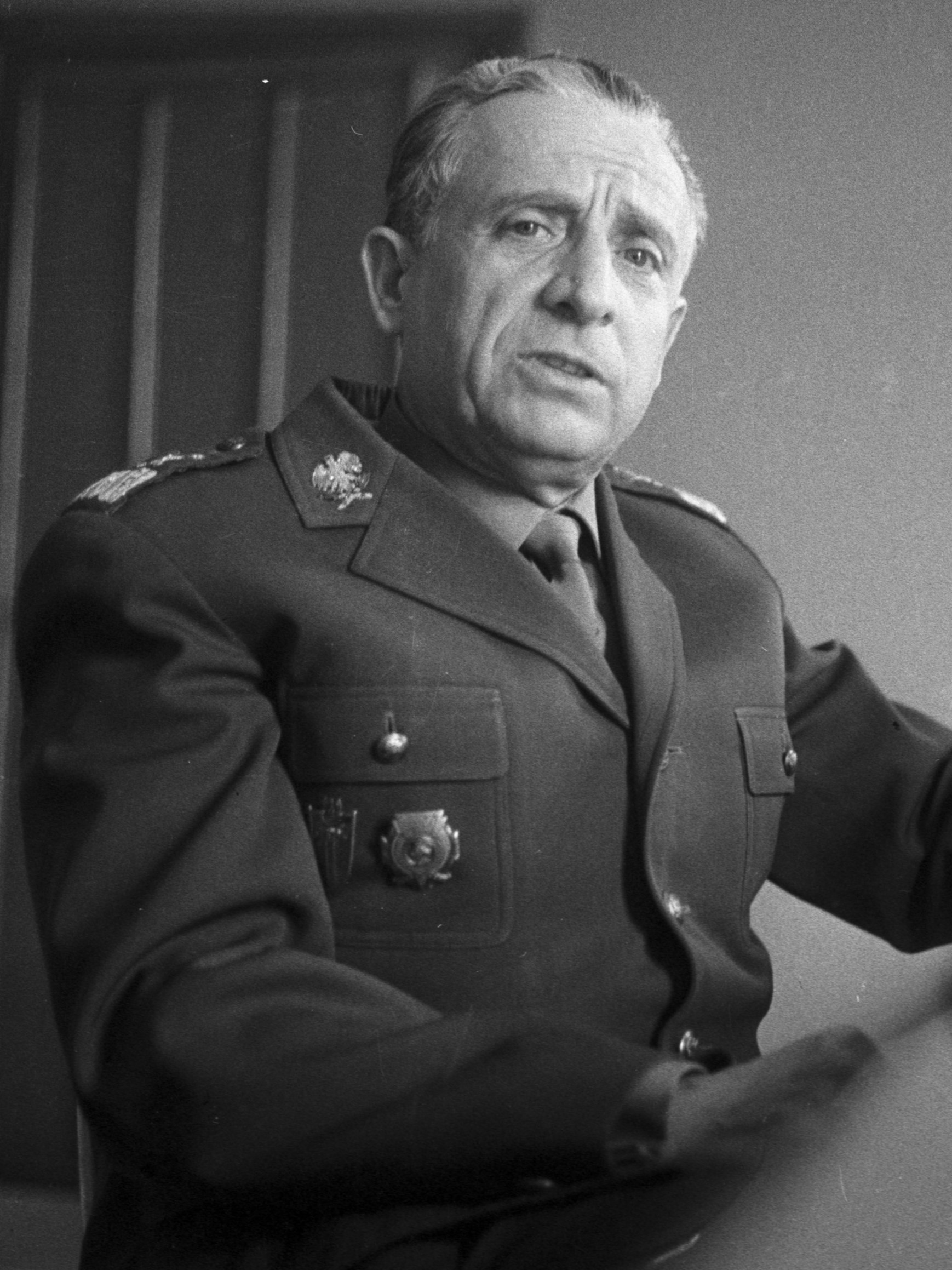
- Spychalski in 1965

3rd Chairman of the Polish Council of State
- In office 10 April 1968 – 23 December 1970
- Prime Minister: Józef Cyrankiewicz
- First Secretary: Władysław Gomułka; Edward Gierek
- President in exile: August Zaleski; Council of Three
- Preceded by: Edward Ochab
- Succeeded by: Józef Cyrankiewicz

Minister of National Defence
- In office 13 November 1956 – 11 April 1968
- Prime Minister: Józef Cyrankiewicz
- Preceded by: Konstanty Rokossowski
- Succeeded by: Wojciech Jaruzelski

Mayor of Warsaw
- In office 18 September 1944 – 5 March 1945
- Preceded by: Marceli Porowski
- Succeeded by: Stanisław Tołwiński

Personal details
- Born: 6 December 1906 Łódź, Piotrków Governorate, Congress Poland, Russian Empire
- Died: 7 June 1980 (aged 73) Warsaw, Polish People's Republic
- Party: PPR (1942-48); PZPR (1948-80)
- Other political affiliations: Communist Party of Poland
- Awards
- Nickname(s): Marek, Orka

Military service
- Allegiance: Provisional Government of National Unity; Polish People's Republic
- Branch/service: Polish People's Army
- Years of service: 1944–1949; 1956–1968
- Rank: Marszałek Polski (Marshal of Poland)
- Commands: Gwardia Ludowa; Defence Minister
- Battles/wars: World War II

Marian "Marek" Spychalski (Polish: [ˈmarjan spɨˈxalskʲi]; 6 December 1906 – 7 June 1980) was a Polish architect in pre-war Poland, and later, military commander and a communist politician. During World War II he belonged to the Polish underground forces operating within Poland and was one of the leaders of the People's Guard, then People's Army. He held several key political posts during the PRL era, most notably; Chairman of the Council of State, mayor of Warsaw and Defence Minister.

== Biography ==
=== Early career ===
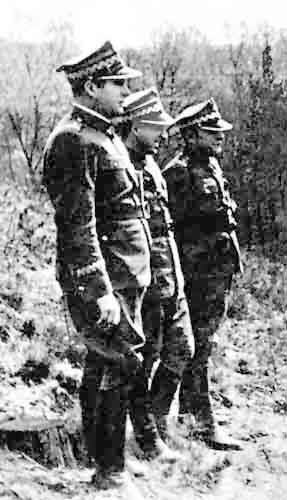
Spychalski (centre) with Świerczewski (right) and Rola-Żymierski, 1945

Born to a working-class family in Łódź, Spychalski graduated from the Faculty of Architecture of the Warsaw University of Technology in 1931. That same year he joined the KPP, and kept his membership after the Nazi-Soviet invasion, when in 1942 KPP became the Polish Workers' Party, renamed in 1948 as the Polish United Workers' Party. Before World War II, he practiced architecture and won several national and international competitions and awards.

=== World War Two ===
He was in Warsaw during the German invasion and it was not until December 1939 that he fled to Lemberg where his wife and daughter were already waiting for him. However, the family only stayed briefly in Soviet-occupied Lviv and returned to Warsaw in January 1940. Until 1942 he officially held a position in the Warsaw city administration as an architect, but also worked illegally and took part in the activities of the Polish resistance. At first he was involved in publishing a bulletin for a group of communist intellectuals, and from 1941 he became a member of the organization Związek Walki Wyzwoleńczej (League of the Liberation Struggle). From 1942 he was temporarily chief of the general staff of the communist Armia Ludowa and from July 22, 1944, of the Polish People's Army. He had also been a member of the Polish Workers' Party since it was founded in 1942.

=== Polish People's Republic ===
After World War II, he held a number of offices in the government of Poland, one of his first being mayor of Warsaw (18 September 1944 – March 1945), with the war still in progress. Among other posts, he was a long-time member of the parliament, a close friend of Władysław Gomułka, and from 1945 to 1948 was both Deputy Minister of Defense and a member of the Politburo of the Polish United Workers' Party.

He was removed from his remaining political posts in 1949. He spent several months in Wrocław, where he worked as an architect (among other things, he designed a development plan for the Grunwaldzki Square area, implementing the principles of socialist realism – the first plan of its kind in Poland). In 1950 he was imprisoned as part of the Stalinist purges of social-democrats in 1949–1953, where he was accused of anti-Soviet tendencies akin to Titoism and right-wing nationalism. During his interrogations, which were conducted under torture, he confessed to charges such as cooperation with the Gestapo and the Home Army during the war. In 1951 he appeared in a show trial where he was instructed to deliver official (and false) testimony against Gomułka. He was only released in the mass release of political prisoners in April 1956, and subsequently reinstated in the Polish United Workers' Party.

With Gomułka's rehabilitation and return to power in 1956, Spychalski became the Polish Minister of Defence. In 1959 he again became a member of the Politburo, and in 1963 he was promoted to Field Marshal.

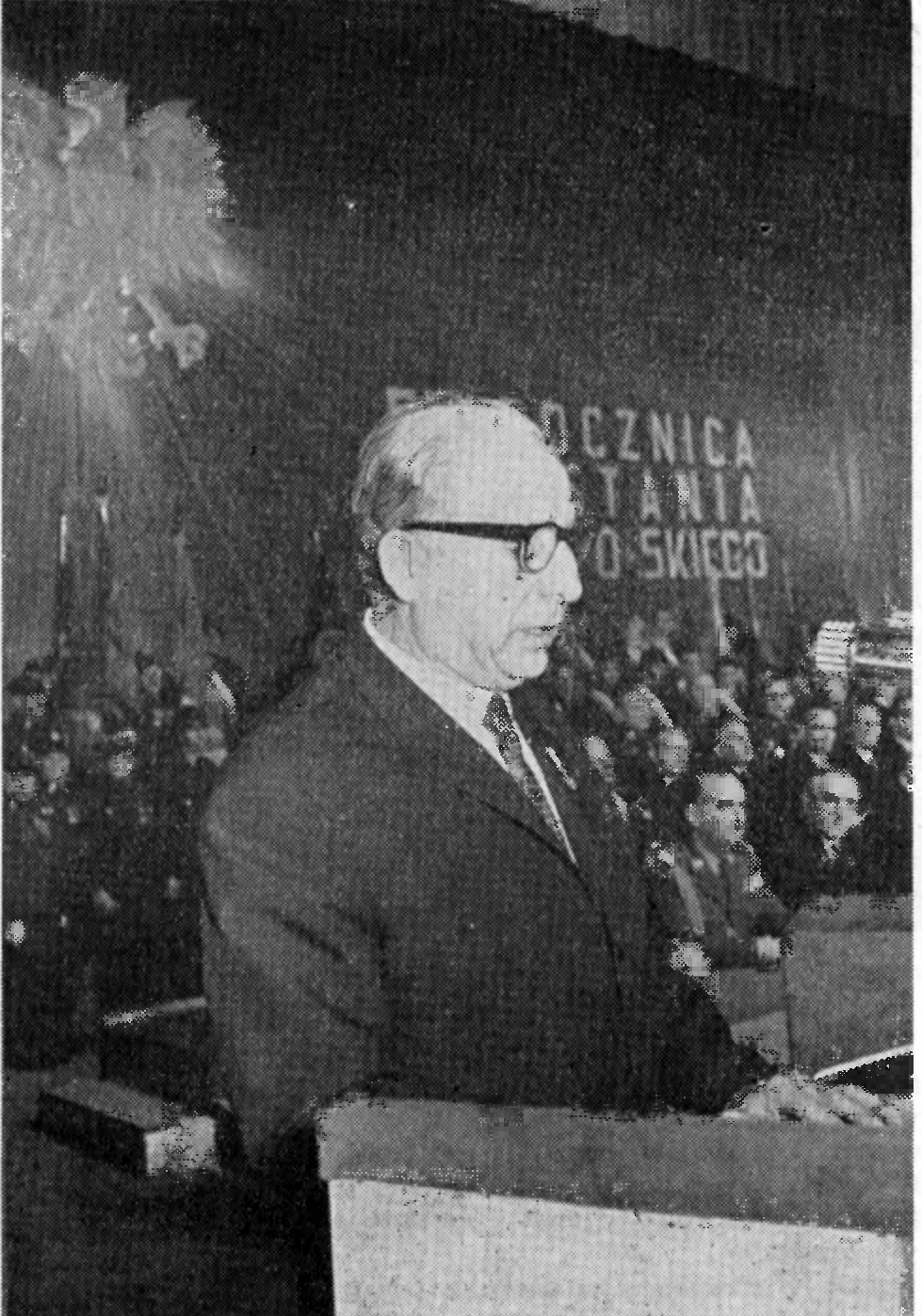
Chairman of the Council of State Marian Spychalski giving a speech, 1968

In 1968 during the anti-Zionist purge of the army, at Gomułka's request he left the Polish Army and his job as Minister of Defense, to assume civilian posts as President of the Front of National Unity, and from 10 April 1968 to 23 December 1970 as Chairman of the Council of State – the de facto head of state of Poland – the Council being the de jure executive authority in the People's Republic, although some considered the post to be mostly symbolic.

==== Descent from power ====
As head of state, Spychalski was nearly assassinated at Karachi airport in Pakistan on 1 November 1970 during the welcoming ceremonies. The Gettysburg Times informed that an anti-communist Islamic fundamentalist Feroze Abdullah drove a lorry at high speed into the Polish delegation, narrowly missing his intended target but killing the Polish Deputy Foreign Minister Zygfryd Wolniak (48) and three Pakistani representatives including the deputy director of the Intelligence Bureau, Chaudhri Mohammed Nazir, and two photographers.

Spychalski lost his posts as close associate of Gomułka, when Edward Gierek replaced Gomułka as First Secretary of the Polish United Workers' Party during the 1970 Polish protests throughout December. Spychalski retired and wrote a four volume memoir which is now in the archives of the Hoover Institution in California. He died on 7 June 1980, survived by his wife Barbara who also wrote about him.

== Promotions ==
- Major (Major) - 1943
- Podpułkownik (Lieutenant colonel) - 1 January 1944
- Pułkownik (Colonel) - 11 November 1944
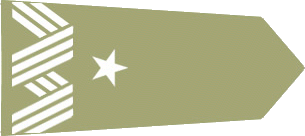
- Generał brygady (Brigadier general) - 6 February 1945
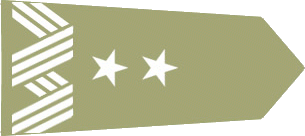
- Generał dywizji (Major general) - 3 May 1945
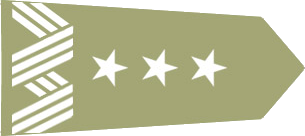
- Generał broni (Lieutenant general) - 22 July 1957
- Marszałek Polski (Marshal of Poland) - 7 October 1963

== Honours and awards ==
- Order of the Builders of People's Poland
- Order of the Banner of Labour, 1st Class
- Commander's Cross with Star of the Order of Polonia Restituta
- Order of the Cross of Grunwald, 2nd Class
- Commander's Cross of the Order of Polonia Restituta
- Knight's Cross of the Virtuti Militari
- Order of the Cross of Grunwald, 3rd Class
- Partisan Cross (12 June 1946)
- Medal of the 30th Anniversary of People's Poland
- Medal for Oder, Neisse and Baltic
- Medal for Warsaw 1939–1945
- Medal of Victory and Freedom 1945
- Golden Medal of the Armed Forces in the Service of the Homeland
- Silver Medal of the Armed Forces in the Service of the Homeland
- Bronze Medal of the Armed Forces in the Service of the Homeland
- Medal of the 10th Anniversary of People's Poland
- Medal for Participation in the Battle of Berlin
- Golden Medal "For Merit in National Defense"
- Silver Medal "For Merit in National Defense"
- Bronze Medal "For Merit in National Defense"
- Badge of the 1000th Anniversary of the Polish State
- Badge "Meritorious activist ORMO"
- Military Order of the White Lion, 1st Class (Czechoslovakia)
- Military Order of the White Lion, 5th Class (Czechoslovakia)
- Grand Cross of the Order of the Crown (Belgium)
- Grand Cross of the Order of the White Rose (Finland)
- Order of the Partisan Star (Yugoslavia)
- Medal for Bravery (Yugoslavia)
- Order of Georgi Dimitrov (Bulgaria)
- Order of Lenin (USSR)
- Medal "For the Victory over Germany in the Great Patriotic War 1941–1945" (USSR)
- Jubilee Medal "Twenty Years of Victory in the Great Patriotic War 1941–1945" (USSR)
- Jubilee Medal "Thirty Years of Victory in the Great Patriotic War 1941–1945" (USSR)
- Jubilee Medal "50 Years of the Armed Forces of the USSR" (USSR)
- Jubilee Medal "In Commemoration of the 100th Anniversary of the Birth of Vladimir Ilyich Lenin" (USSR)

Political offices
Preceded by Edward Ochab	Chairman of the Polish Council of State; 10 April 1968 – 23 December 1970	Succeeded by Józef Cyrankiewicz
Preceded by Konstantin Rokossovsky	Polish Minister of Defence; 1956 – 1968	Succeeded by Wojciech Jaruzelski
