= Zawieprzyce =

- Village
- Chapel of Saint Anthony of Padua

- Location within Poland
- Coordinates: 51°22′N 22°46′E
- Country: Poland
- Voivodeship: Lublin
- County: Łęczna
- Gmina: Spiczyn

Zawieprzyce [zavjɛˈpʂɨt͡sɛ] is a village in the administrative district of Gmina Spiczyn, within Łęczna County, Lublin Voivodeship, in eastern Poland.

== Landmarks ==
Zawieprzyce is home to a large Baroque palace complex from 17th century. The main palace building, orangerie and some other structures are ruined already, while some other buildings like the chapel, granary or the obelisk are still standing.
