= Ziółków =

- Village
- Location within Poland
- Coordinates: 51°18′N 22°48′E
- Country: Poland
- Voivodeship: Lublin
- County: Łęczna
- Gmina: Spiczyn

Ziółków [ˈʑuu̯kuf] is a village in the administrative district of Gmina Spiczyn, within Łęczna County, Lublin Voivodeship, in eastern Poland.
