= Krzówka =

Village in Lublin Voivodeship, Poland

- Village
- Location within Poland
- Coordinates: 51°39′57″N 22°14′37″E
- Country: Poland
- Voivodeship: Lublin
- County: Łuków
- Gmina: Serokomla
- Elevation: 158 m (518 ft)
- Population (2009): 192
- Time zone: UTC+1 (CET)
  - Summer (DST): UTC+2 (CEST)
- Postal code: 21-413
- Area code: +48 25
- Car plates: LLU

Krzówka [ˈkʂufka] is a village in the administrative district of Gmina Serokomla, within Łuków County, Lublin Voivodeship, in eastern Poland. It has a primary school with under 100 pupils.

In 1827 it had 33 houses and 171 inhabitants; in 1883 it had decreased to 15 houses and 90 inhabitants.
