= Gmina Spiczyn =

Gmina Spiczyn Spiczyn Commune
- Gmina
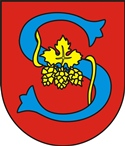
- Coat of arms
- Interactive map of Gmina Spiczyn
- Coordinates (Spiczyn): 51°21′N 22°46′E
- Country: Poland
- Voivodeship: Lublin
- County: Łęczna
- Seat: Spiczyn

Area
  - Total: 83.1 km^{2} (32.1 sq mi)

Population (2015)
  - Total: 5,628
  - Density: 67.7/km^{2} (175/sq mi)

Gmina Spiczyn is a rural gmina (administrative district) in Łęczna County, Lublin Voivodeship, in eastern Poland. Its seat is the village of Spiczyn, which lies approximately 10 kilometres (6 mi) north-west of Łęczna and 18 km (11 mi) north-east of the regional capital Lublin.

The gmina covers an area of 83.1 square kilometres (32.1 sq mi), and as of 2006 its total population is 5,492 (5,628 in 2015).

== Villages ==
Gmina Spiczyn contains the villages and settlements of Charlęż, Januszówka, Jawidz, Kijany, Ludwików, Nowa Wólka, Nowy Radzic, Spiczyn, Stawek, Zawieprzyce, Zawieprzyce-Kolonia and Ziółków.

== Neighbouring gminas ==
Gmina Spiczyn is bordered by the gminas of Łęczna, Lubartów, Ludwin, Niemce, Ostrów Lubelski, Serniki and Wólka.
