= Bronisławów Duży =

- Village
- Location within Poland
- Coordinates: 51°43′43″N 22°21′51″E
- Country: Poland
- Voivodeship: Lublin
- County: Łuków
- Gmina: Serokomla

Bronisławów Duży [brɔniˈswavuf ˈduʐɨ] is a village in the administrative district of Gmina Serokomla, within Łuków County, Lublin Voivodeship, in eastern Poland.
