= Stawek, Gmina Spiczyn =

Stawek
- Village
- Location within Poland
- Coordinates: 51°19′15″N 22°45′32″E
- Country: Poland
- Voivodeship: Lublin
- County: Łęczna
- Gmina: Spiczyn

Stawek [ˈstavɛk] is a village in the administrative district of Gmina Spiczyn, within Łęczna County, Lublin Voivodeship, in eastern Poland.
