= Ciężkie =

- Village
- Location within Poland
- Coordinates: 51°48′N 22°22′E
- Country: Poland
- Voivodeship: Lublin
- County: Łuków
- Gmina: Wojcieszków

Ciężkie [ˈt͡ɕɛ̃ʂkʲɛ] is a village in the administrative district of Gmina Wojcieszków, within Łuków County, Lublin Voivodeship, in eastern Poland.
