= Oszczepalin Pierwszy =

- Village
- Location within Poland
- Coordinates: 51°45′8″N 22°23′48″E
- Country: Poland
- Voivodeship: Lublin
- County: Łuków
- Gmina: Wojcieszków
- Population: 310

Oszczepalin Pierwszy [ɔʂt͡ʂɛˈpalin ˈpjɛrfʂɨ] is a village in the administrative district of Gmina Wojcieszków, within Łuków County, Lublin Voivodeship, in eastern Poland.
