= Zawieprzyce-Kolonia =

- Village
- Location within Poland
- Coordinates: 51°22′25″N 22°45′59″E
- Country: Poland
- Voivodeship: Lublin
- County: Łęczna
- Gmina: Spiczyn
- Population: 330

Zawieprzyce-Kolonia [zavjɛˈpʂɨt͡sɛ kɔˈlɔɲa] is a village in the administrative district of Gmina Spiczyn, within Łęczna County, Lublin Voivodeship, in eastern Poland.
