= Józefów Duży =

- Village
- Location within Poland
- Coordinates: 51°42′55″N 22°18′52″E
- Country: Poland
- Voivodeship: Lublin
- County: Łuków
- Gmina: Serokomla

Józefów Duży (Polish pronunciation: [juˈzɛfuv ˈduʐɨ]) is a village in the administrative district of Gmina Serokomla, within Łuków County, Lublin Voivodeship, in eastern Poland.
