= Bronisławów Mały =

- Village
- Location within Poland
- Coordinates: 51°43′54″N 22°20′06″E
- Country: Poland
- Voivodeship: Lublin
- County: Łuków
- Gmina: Serokomla

Bronisławów Mały [brɔniˈswavuf ˈmawɨ] is a village in the administrative district of Gmina Serokomla, within Łuków County, Lublin Voivodeship, in eastern Poland.
