= Siedliska, Łuków County =

Siedliska
- Village
- Location within Poland
- Coordinates: 51°49′N 22°18′E
- Country: Poland
- Voivodeship: Lublin
- County: Łuków
- Gmina: Wojcieszków

Siedliska [ɕɛdˈlʲiska] is a village in the administrative district of Gmina Wojcieszków, within Łuków County, Lublin Voivodeship, in eastern Poland.
