= Gmina Serokomla =

Gmina Serokomla Serokomla Commune
- Gmina
- Coat of arms
- Interactive map of Gmina Serokomla
- Coordinates (Serokomla): 51°42′1″N 22°19′58″E
- Country: Poland
- Voivodeship: Lublin
- County: Łuków
- Seat: Serokomla

Area
  - Total: 77.23 km^{2} (29.82 sq mi)

Population (2006)
  - Total: 4,157
  - Density: 53.83/km^{2} (139.4/sq mi)
- Website: http://www.serokomla.asi.pl

Gmina Serokomla is a rural gmina (administrative district) in Łuków County, Lublin Voivodeship, in eastern Poland. Its seat is the village of Serokomla, which lies approximately 25 kilometres (16 mi) south of Łuków and 53 km (33 mi) north of the regional capital Lublin.

The gmina covers an area of 77.23 square kilometres (29.8 sq mi), and as of 2006 its total population is 4,157.

== Villages ==
Gmina Serokomla contains the villages and settlements of Bielany Duże, Bronisławów Duży, Bronisławów Mały, Charlejów, Czarna, Ernestynów, Hordzież, Józefów Duży, Krzówka, Leonardów, Nowa Ruda, Pieńki, Poznań, Ruda, Serokomla, Wola Bukowska and Wólka.

== Neighbouring gminas ==
Gmina Serokomla is bordered by the gminas of Adamów, Jeziorzany, Kock and Wojcieszków.
