= Ernestynów, Lublin Voivodeship =

Ernestynów
- Village
- Location within Poland
- Coordinates: 51°41′N 22°16′E
- Country: Poland
- Voivodeship: Lublin
- County: Łuków
- Gmina: Serokomla

Ernestynów [ɛrnɛsˈtɨnuf] is a village in the administrative district of Gmina Serokomla, within Łuków County, Lublin Voivodeship, in eastern Poland.
