= Helenów, Gmina Wojcieszków =

Helenów
- Village
- Location within Poland
- Coordinates: 51°47′24″N 22°19′04″E
- Country: Poland
- Voivodeship: Lublin
- County: Łuków
- Gmina: Wojcieszków
- Population: 90

Helenów [xɛˈlɛnuf] is a village in the administrative district of Gmina Wojcieszków, within Łuków County, Lublin Voivodeship, in eastern Poland.
