= Ruda, Gmina Serokomla =

Ruda
- Village
- Location within Poland
- Coordinates: 51°41′33″N 22°22′19″E
- Country: Poland
- Voivodeship: Lublin
- County: Łuków
- Gmina: Serokomla

Ruda [ˈruda] is a village in the administrative district of Gmina Serokomla, within Łuków County, Lublin Voivodeship, in eastern Poland.
