= Zofijówka, Lublin Voivodeship =

Zofijówka
- Village
- Location within Poland
- Coordinates: 51°44′32″N 22°22′07″E
- Country: Poland
- Voivodeship: Lublin
- County: Łuków
- Gmina: Wojcieszków

Zofijówka [zɔfiˈjufka] is a village in the administrative district of Gmina Wojcieszków, within Łuków County, Lublin Voivodeship, in eastern Poland.
