= Wola Bukowska =

- Village
- Location within Poland
- Coordinates: 51°40′39″N 22°22′09″E
- Country: Poland
- Voivodeship: Lublin
- County: Łuków
- Gmina: Serokomla

Wola Bukowska (Polish pronunciation: [ˈvɔla buˈkɔfska]) is a village in the administrative district of Gmina Serokomla, within Łuków County, Lublin Voivodeship, in eastern Poland.
