= Charlęż =

- Village
- Location within Poland
- Coordinates: 51°20′N 22°43′E
- Country: Poland
- Voivodeship: Lublin
- County: Łęczna
- Gmina: Spiczyn
- Population (approx.): 740

Charlęż [ˈxarlɛ̃ʂ] is a village in the administrative district of Gmina Spiczyn, within Łęczna County, Lublin Voivodeship, in eastern Poland.
