= Wola Bystrzycka =

- Village
- Location within Poland
- Coordinates: 51°46′N 22°20′E
- Country: Poland
- Voivodeship: Lublin
- County: Łuków
- Gmina: Wojcieszków
- Time zone: UTC+1 (CET)
  - Summer (DST): UTC+2 (CEST)

Wola Bystrzycka [ˈvɔla bɨsˈtʂɨt͡ska] is a village in the administrative district of Gmina Wojcieszków, within Łuków County, Lublin Voivodeship, in eastern Poland.

== History ==
Three Polish citizens were murdered by Nazi Germany in the village during World War II.
