= Świderki =

- Village
- Location within Poland
- Coordinates: 51°51′N 22°21′E
- Country: Poland
- Voivodeship: Lublin
- County: Łuków
- Gmina: Wojcieszków

Świderki [ɕfiˈdɛrki] is a village in the administrative district of Gmina Wojcieszków, within Łuków County, Lublin Voivodeship, in eastern Poland.
