= Ludwików, Łęczna County =

Ludwików
- Village
- Location within Poland
- Coordinates: 51°18′00″N 22°47′00″E
- Country: Poland
- Voivodeship: Lublin
- County: Łęczna
- Gmina: Spiczyn

Ludwików [ludˈvikuf] is a village in the administrative district of Gmina Spiczyn, within Łęczna County, Lublin Voivodeship, in eastern Poland.
