= Serokomla =

- Village
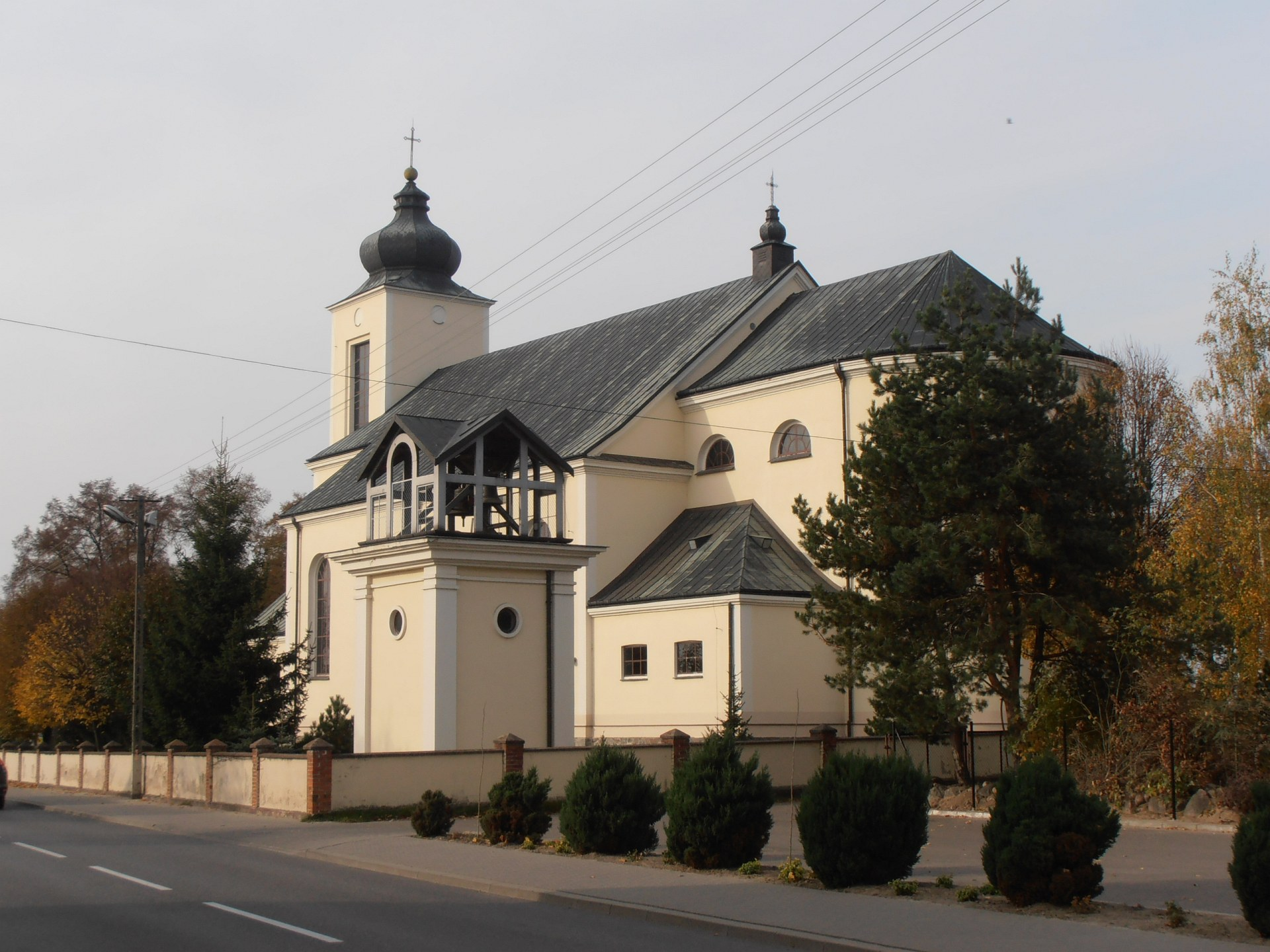
- Roman-Catholic Church of St Stanislaus in Serokomla

- Location within Poland
- Coordinates: 51°42′1″N 22°19′58″E
- Country: Poland
- Voivodeship: Lublin
- County: Łuków
- Gmina: Serokomla
- Population: 1,060

Serokomla pronounced ['sɛrɔˈkɔmla] is a village in Łuków County, Lublin Voivodeship, in eastern Poland. It is the seat of the gmina (administrative district) called Gmina Serokomla.

The village was stripped of city rights during the Russian Partition in 1869.

== History ==
The history of Serokomla dates back to 1573, when a nobleman Piotr Kijenski founded a town based on Magdeburg rights. The town laid in the Lukow Land, Lublin Voivodeship (1474–1795) in the province of Lesser Poland. It was bought by the Firlej family in the late 16th century and remained in private hands until the Partitions of Poland. After the Congress of Vienna (1815) Serokomla found itself in the Russian-controlled Congress Poland, in which it remained until World War I. It became part of the Lublin Voivodeship (1919–39) in the Second Polish Republic.

=== World War II ===
In early October 1939, most of Serokomla was destroyed by the Wehrmacht, during the Battle of Kock (1939). After the battle, the Germans shot 32 Polish soldiers and civilians there in revenge. On April 14, 1940, the SS with the Gestapo captured 217 local inhabitants including women and children. All were shot by Sonderdienst formation in a mass execution nearby. A small Nazi exploitation ghetto was set up for the Jewish community. Then on the morning of September 22, 1942, the travelling Nazi German Reserve Police Battalion 101 under the command of Captain Wohlauf rounded up the 200 to 300 Jews of Serokomla and shot them in the necks one by one at the crest of a waste dump outside the town. The bodies were left unburied and the Germans departed at 3pm. Captain Wohlauf didn't even remember later he was at Serokomla amid the many deportation actions to death camps they conducted in the vicinity.
