= Czarna, Lublin Voivodeship =

Czarna
- Village
- Location within Poland
- Coordinates: 51°43′N 22°16′E
- Country: Poland
- Voivodeship: Lublin
- County: Łuków
- Gmina: Serokomla

Czarna [ˈt͡ʂarna] is a village in the administrative district of Gmina Serokomla, within Łuków County, Lublin Voivodeship, in eastern Poland.
