= Bystrzyca, Łuków County =

Bystrzyca
- Village
- Location within Poland
- Coordinates: 51°46′N 22°19′E
- Country: Poland
- Voivodeship: Lublin
- County: Łuków
- Gmina: Wojcieszków

Bystrzyca [bɨsˈtʂɨt͡sa] is a village in the administrative district of Gmina Wojcieszków, within Łuków County, Lublin Voivodeship, in eastern Poland.
