= Spiczyn =

- Village
- Location within Poland
- Coordinates: 51°21′N 22°46′E
- Country: Poland
- Voivodeship: Lublin
- County: Łęczna
- Gmina: Spiczyn

Spiczyn [ˈspit͡ʂɨn] is a village in Łęczna County, Lublin Voivodeship, in eastern Poland and is the seat of the gmina (administrative district) called Gmina Spiczyn.
