= Hordzież =

Village in Lublin Voivodeship, Poland

- Village
- Location within Poland
- Coordinates: 51°43′N 22°20′E
- Country: Poland
- Voivodeship: Lublin
- County: Łuków
- Gmina: Serokomla

Hordzież [ˈxɔrd͡ʑɛʂ] is a village in the administrative district of Gmina Serokomla, within Łuków County, Lublin Voivodeship, in eastern Poland.
