= Kijany, Lublin Voivodeship =

Kijany
- Village
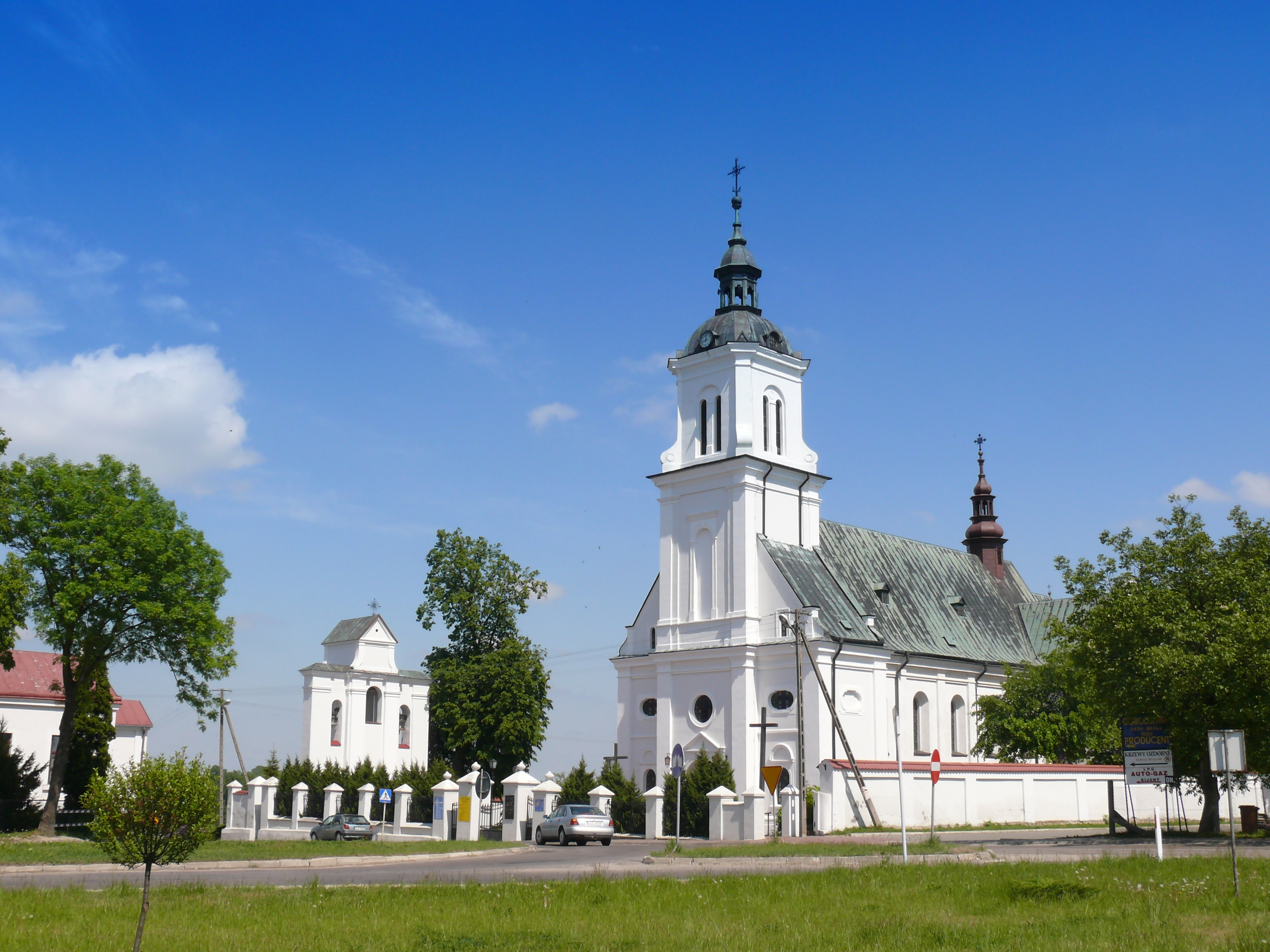
- Church of Saint Anne

- Location within Poland
- Coordinates: 51°20′N 22°46′E
- Country: Poland
- Voivodeship: Lublin
- County: Łęczna
- Gmina: Spiczyn

Population
  - Total: 700
- Time zone: UTC+1 (CET)
  - Summer (DST): UTC+2 (CEST)

Kijany [kiˈjanɨ] is a village in the administrative district of Gmina Spiczyn, within Łęczna County, Lublin Voivodeship, in eastern Poland.

== History ==
Five Polish citizens were murdered by Nazi Germany in the village during World War II.
