= Jawidz =

- Village
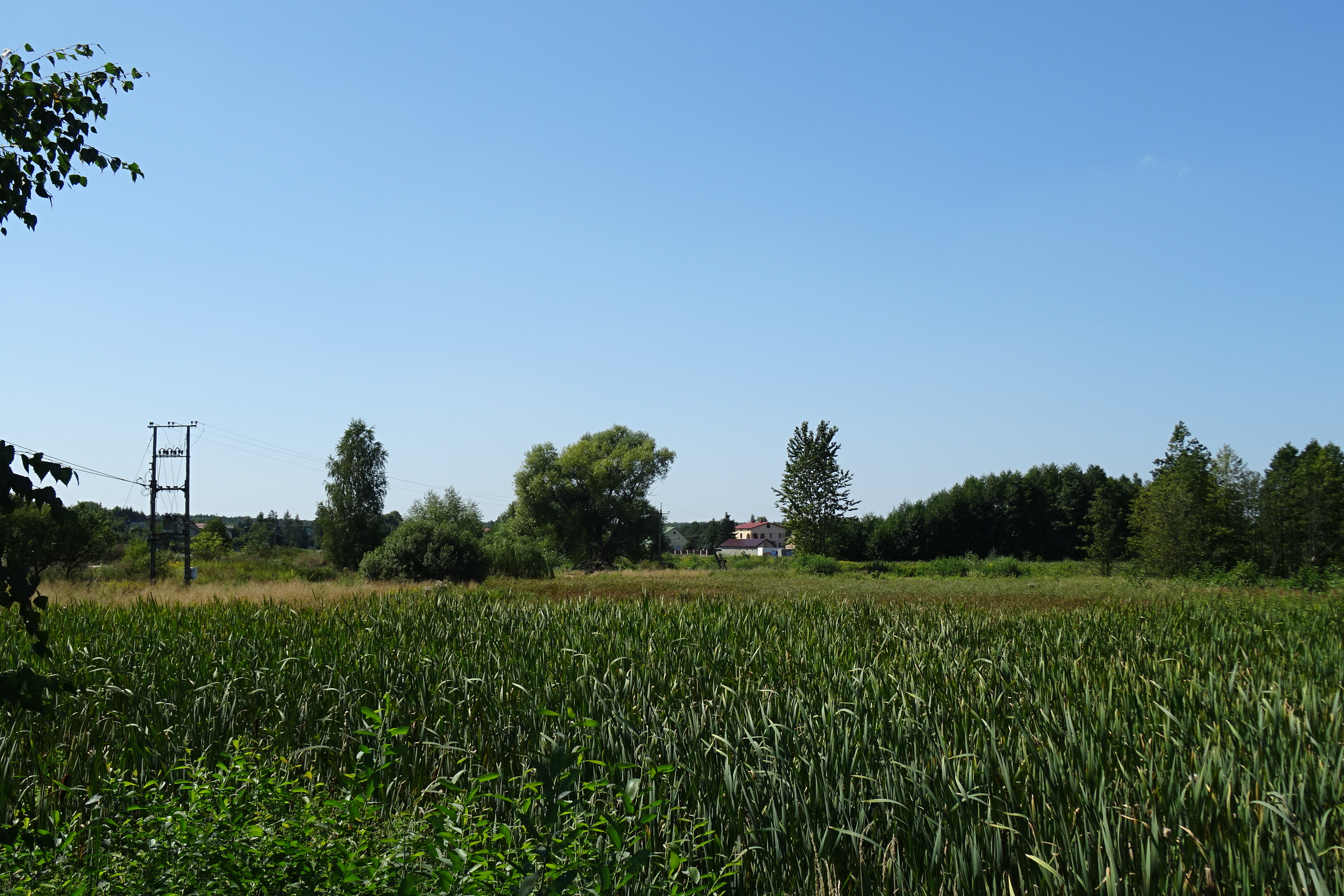

- Location within Poland
- Coordinates: 51°22′0″N 22°43′0″E
- Country: Poland
- Voivodeship: Lublin
- County: Łęczna
- Gmina: Spiczyn

Population (2006)
  - Total: 1,319
- Time zone: UTC+1 (CET)
  - Summer (DST): UTC+2 (CEST)
- Postal code: 21-077
- Area Code: (+48) 81
- Vehicle registration: LLE

Jawidz [ˈjavit͡s] is a village in the administrative district of Gmina Spiczyn, within Łęczna County, Lublin Voivodeship, in eastern Poland.

== History ==
Three Polish citizens were murdered by Nazi Germany in the village during World War II.
