= Burzec =

- Village
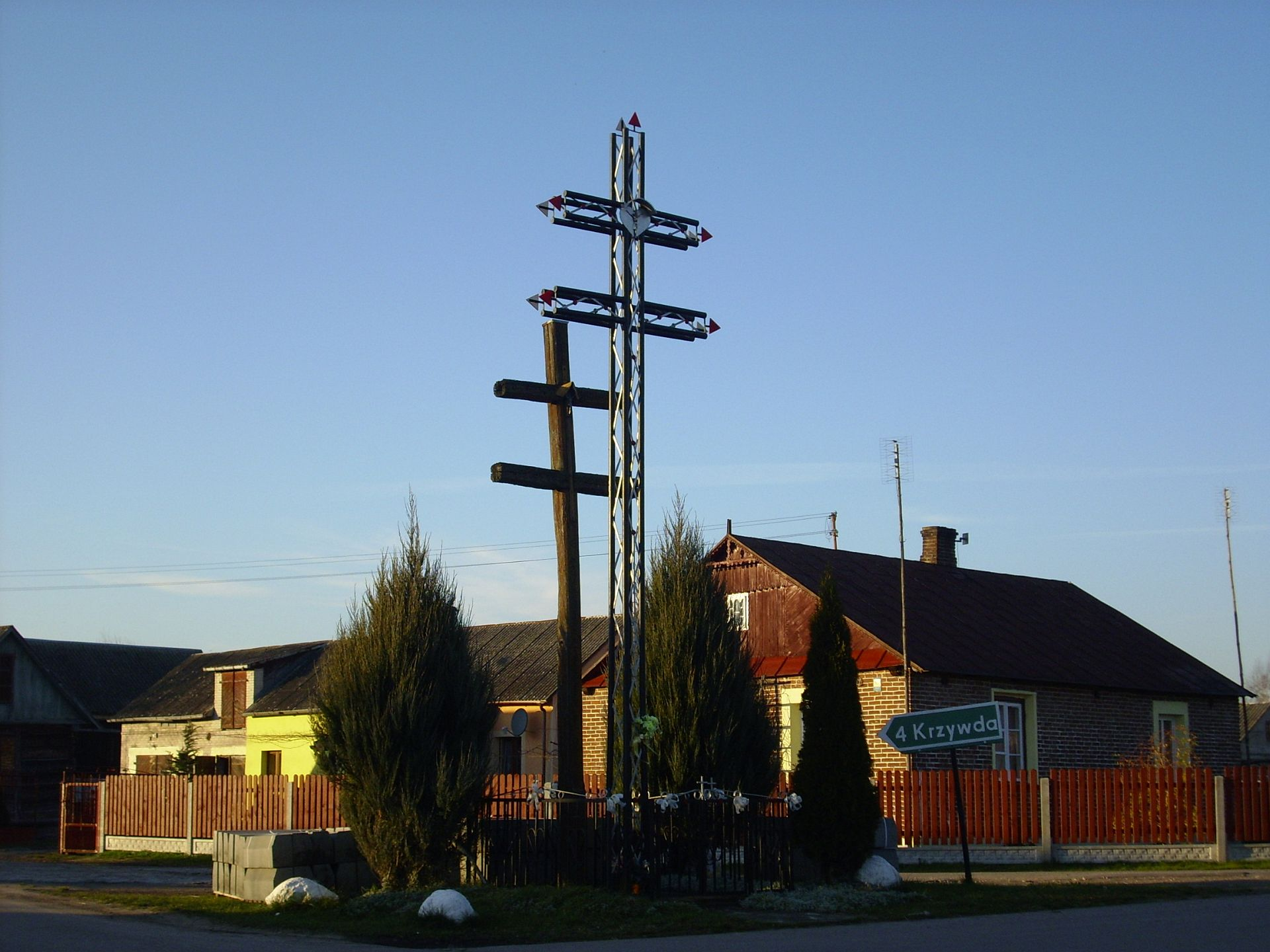

- Location within Poland
- Coordinates: 51°47′N 22°16′E
- Country: Poland
- Voivodeship: Lublin
- County: Łuków
- Gmina: Wojcieszków
- Population: 850

Burzec [ˈbuʐɛt͡s] is a village in the administrative district of Gmina Wojcieszków, within Łuków County, Lublin Voivodeship, in eastern Poland.

In the years 1975-1998 the town administratively belonged to the Siedlce Voivodeship.

In Henryk Sienkiewicz's novel The Deluge, the village is mentioned in the eleventh chapter as belonging to Jan Skrzetuski.

In the interwar period, Sienkiewicz's cousin Stefan Dmochowski lived in the local manor, as well as his brother Roman, the owner of the village Sarnów.
