= Poznań, Lublin Voivodeship =

Poznań
- Village
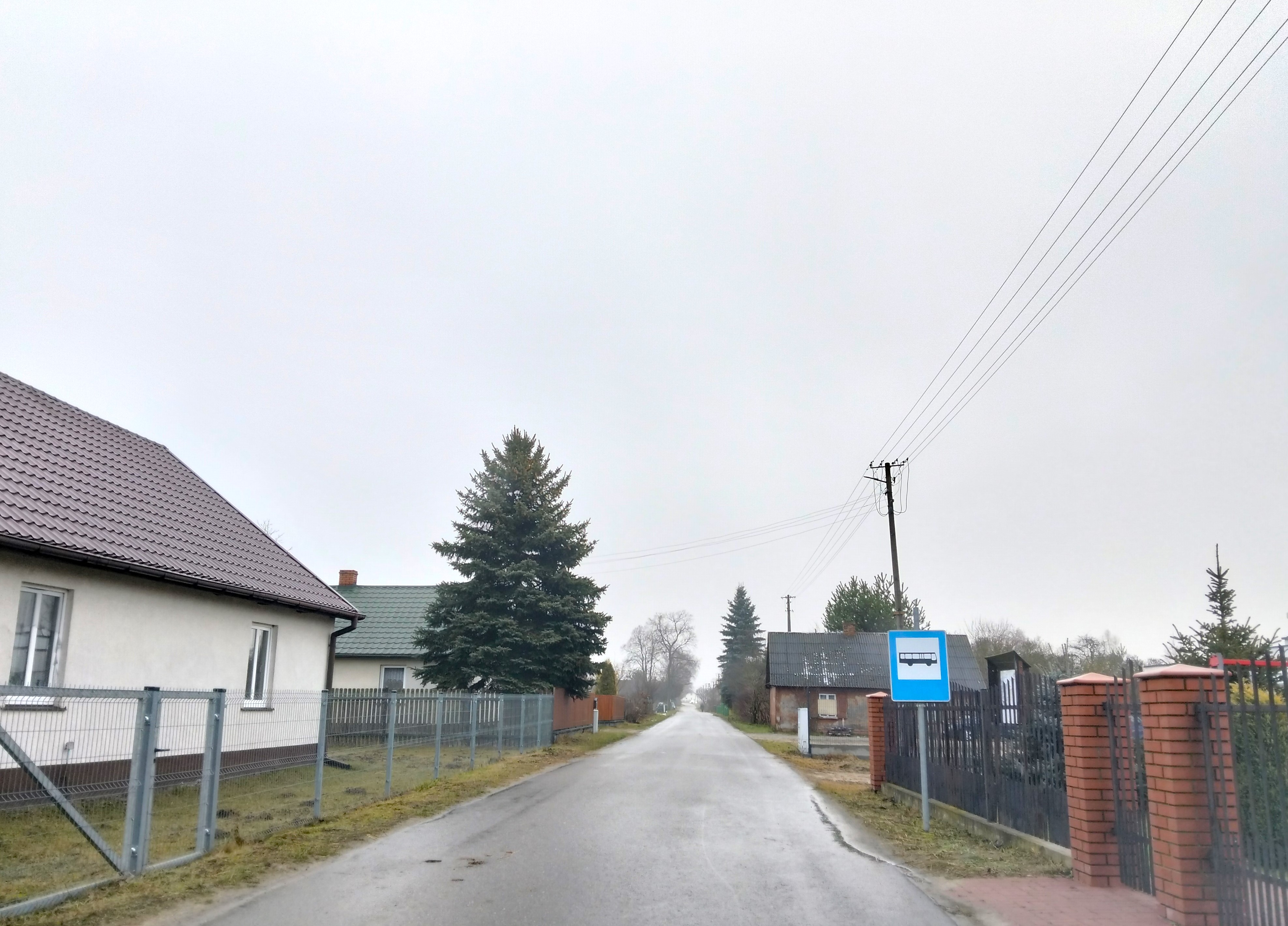

- Location within Poland
- Coordinates: 51°40′43″N 22°17′57″E
- Country: Poland
- Voivodeship: Lublin
- County: Łuków
- Gmina: Serokomla
- Time zone: UTC+1 (CET)
  - Summer (DST): UTC+2 (CEST)
- Vehicle registration: LLU

Poznań (Polish pronunciation: [ˈpɔznaj̃]) is a village in the administrative district of Gmina Serokomla, within Łuków County, Lublin Voivodeship, in eastern Poland.
