= Royal city in Polish–Lithuanian Commonwealth =

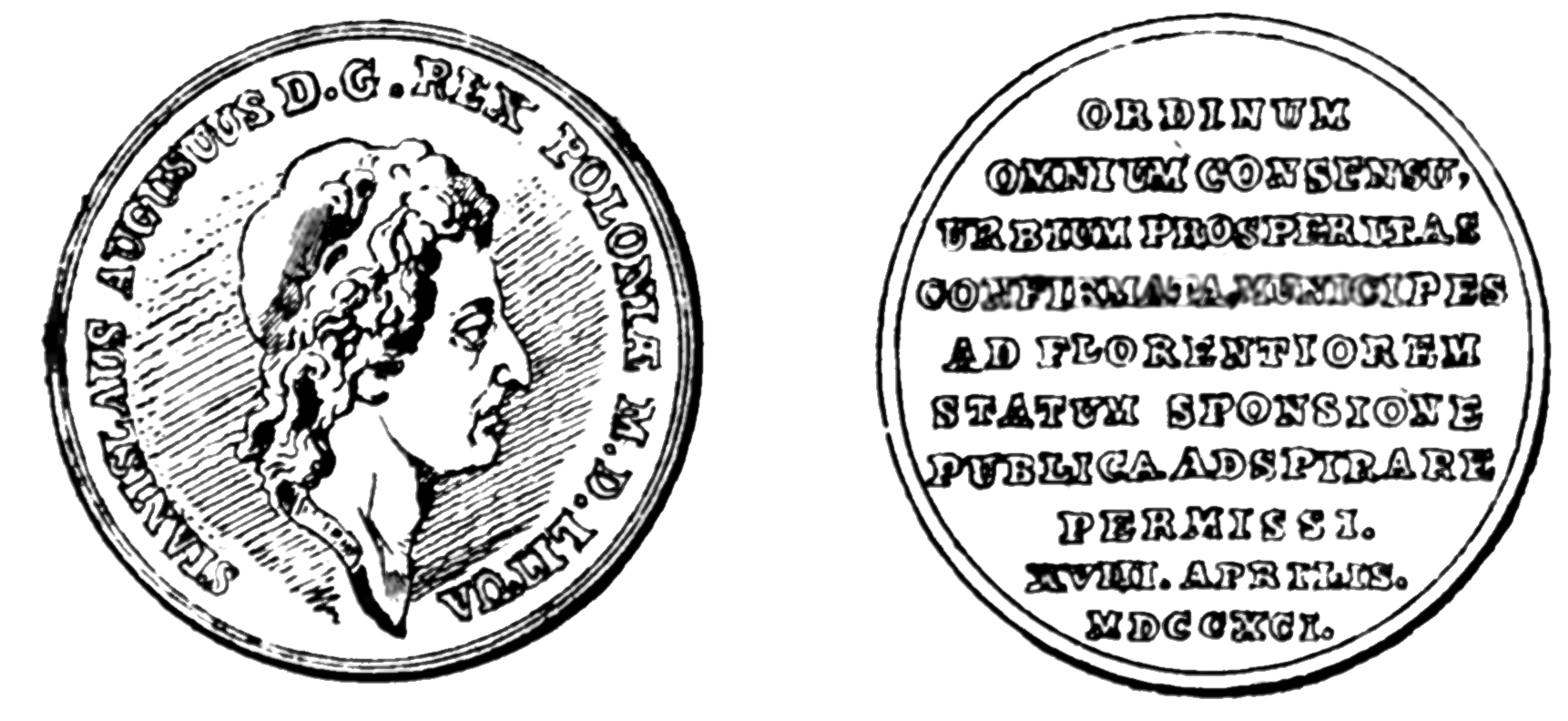
Medal commemorating the Law on the Cities

In the history of Poland, a royal city or royal town (Polish: miasto królewskie) was an urban settlement within the crown lands (Polish: królewszczyzna).

The most influential royal cities enjoyed voting rights during the free election period in Poland (1572–1791). These cities were Gdańsk, Warsaw, Kraków, Poznań, Lwów, Wilno, Toruń, Lublin, Kamieniec and Elbląg. Other important royal cities included Gniezno (ecclesiastical capital of Poland and former capital of early medieval Poland), Płock (former capital of medieval Poland), Piotrków (second most important political center of Poland in the early and mid-16th century as the main location of the Sejm, and then the main Crown Tribunal location alongside Lublin, thus one of the two judiciary capitals of Poland), Grodno (de facto capital of the Polish–Lithuanian Commonwealth in the 1580s and then the general sejm location alongside Warsaw), Bydgoszcz and Kalisz (temporary locations of the Crown Tribunal), and Sandomierz, Przemyśl, Kazimierz.

== Law on the Cities ==
On April 18, 1791, the Great Sejm adopted the Free Royal Cities Act (full title: "Miasta nasze królewskie wolne w państwach Rzeczypospolitej" - "Our Free Royal Cities in the States of the Commonwealth"), included as Article III into the Constitution of May 3, 1791.

The law granted a number of privileges for the residents of royal cities. Many of these privileges and rights have already been enjoyed by major royal cities, and the law effectively equalized all royal cities in this respect. It also includes some rights earlier enjoyed only by szlachta.

== Royal cities by region ==
=== Crown of the Kingdom of Poland ===
==== Greater Poland Province ====
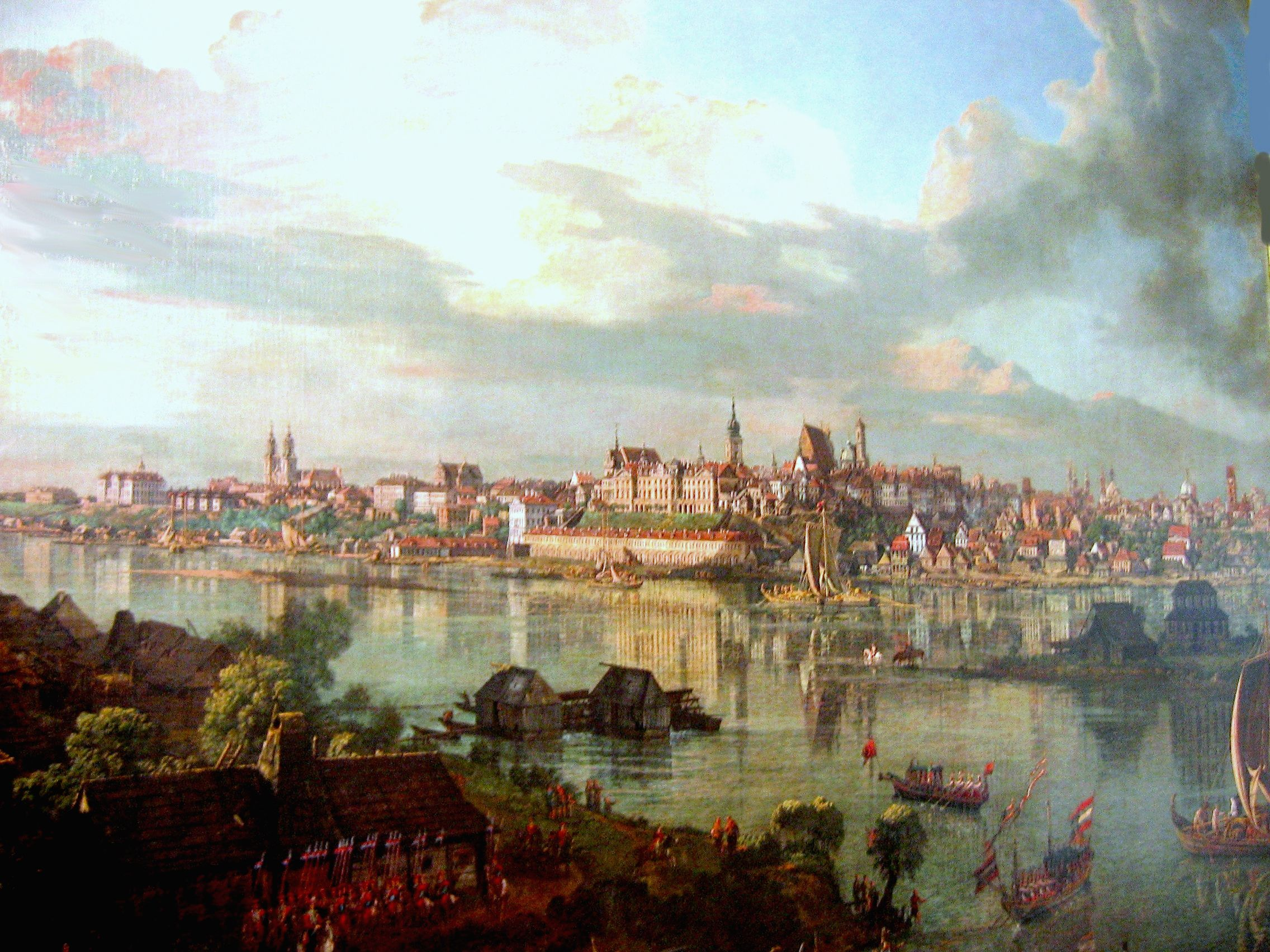
Warsaw in the 18th century

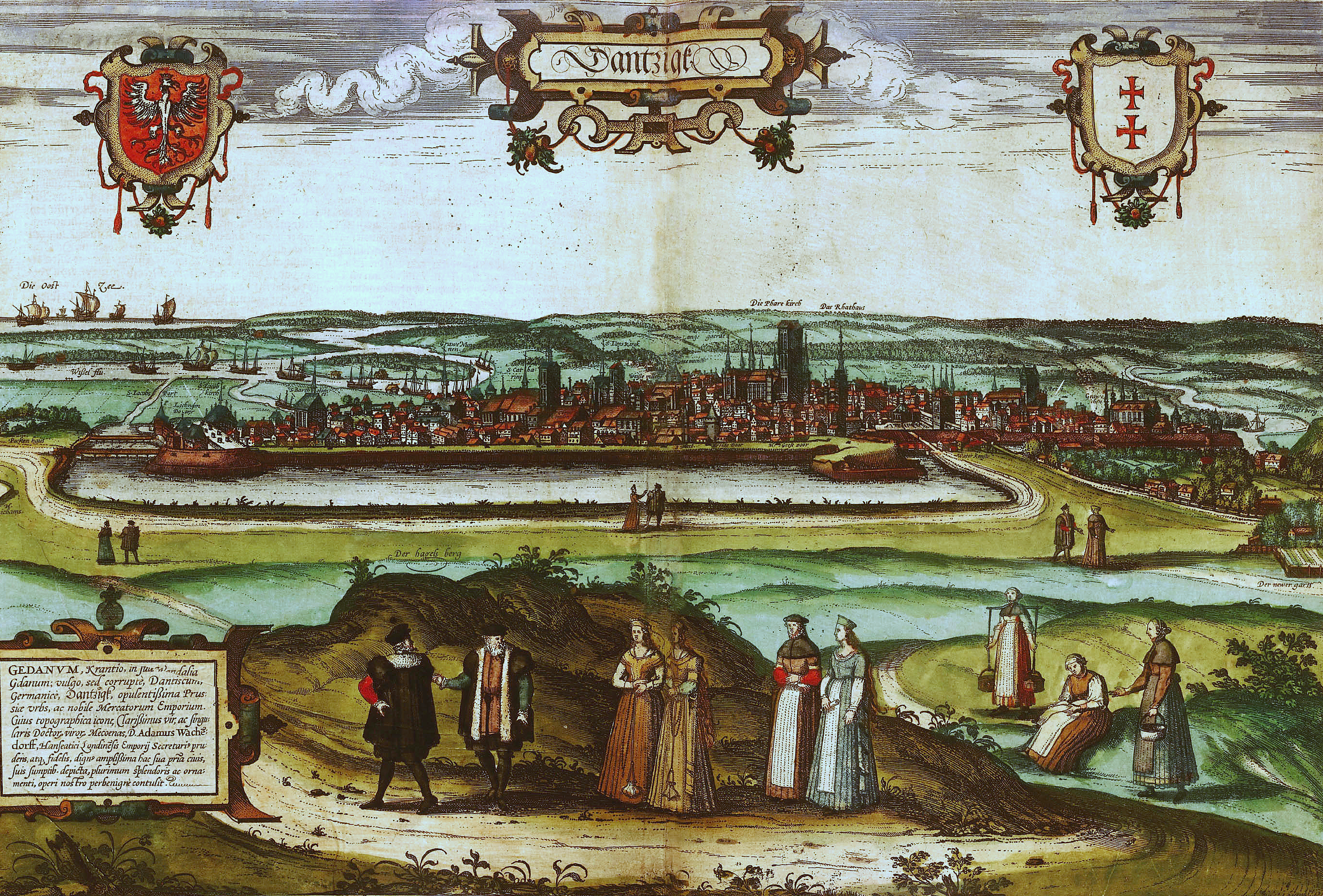
Gdańsk in the 16th century

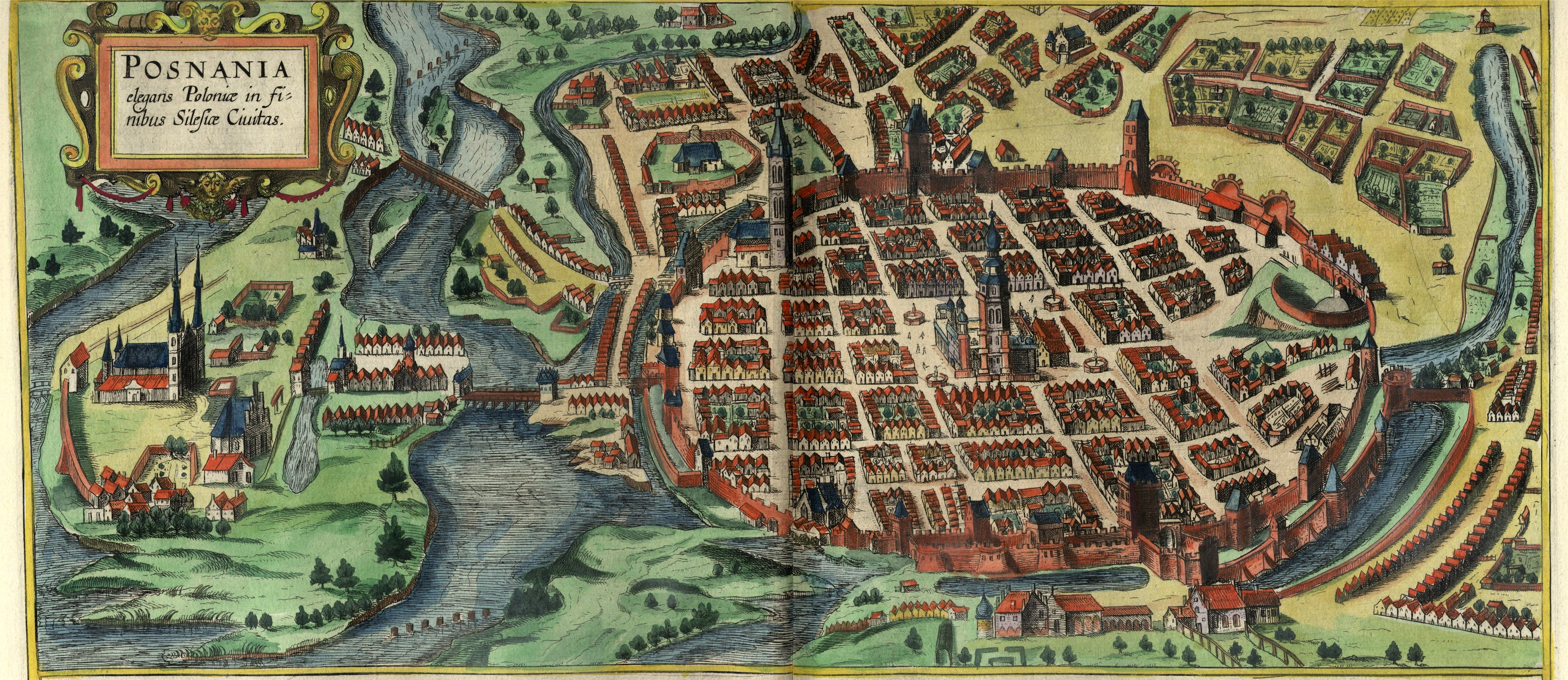
Poznań in the 17th century

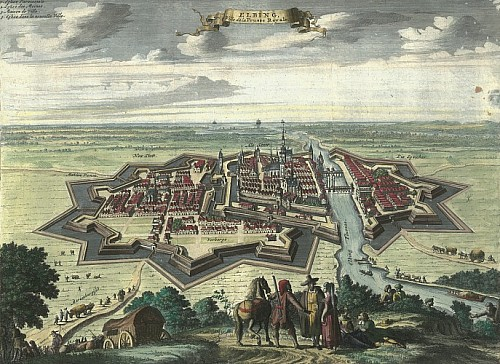
Elbląg in the 18th century

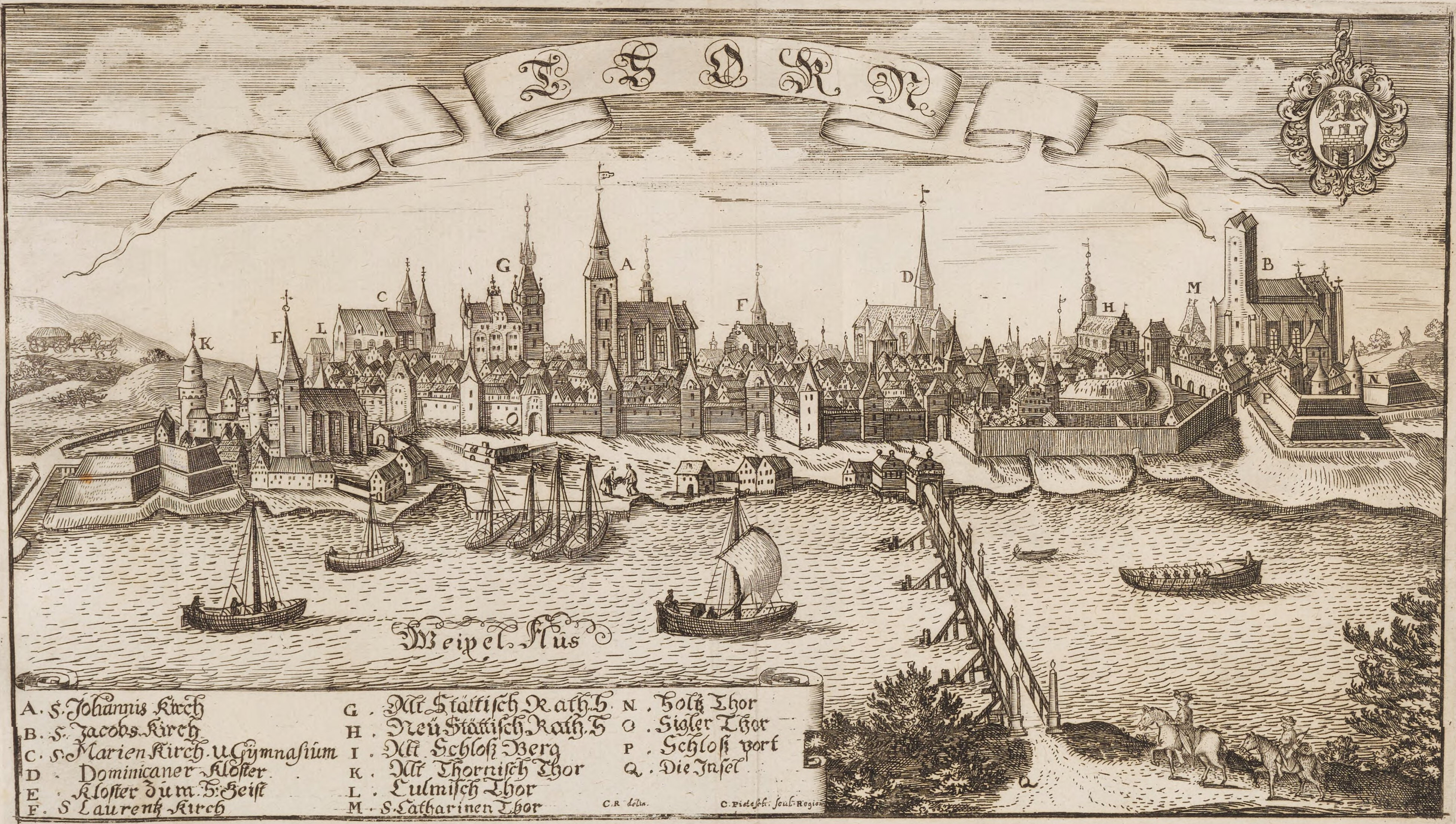
Toruń in the 17th century

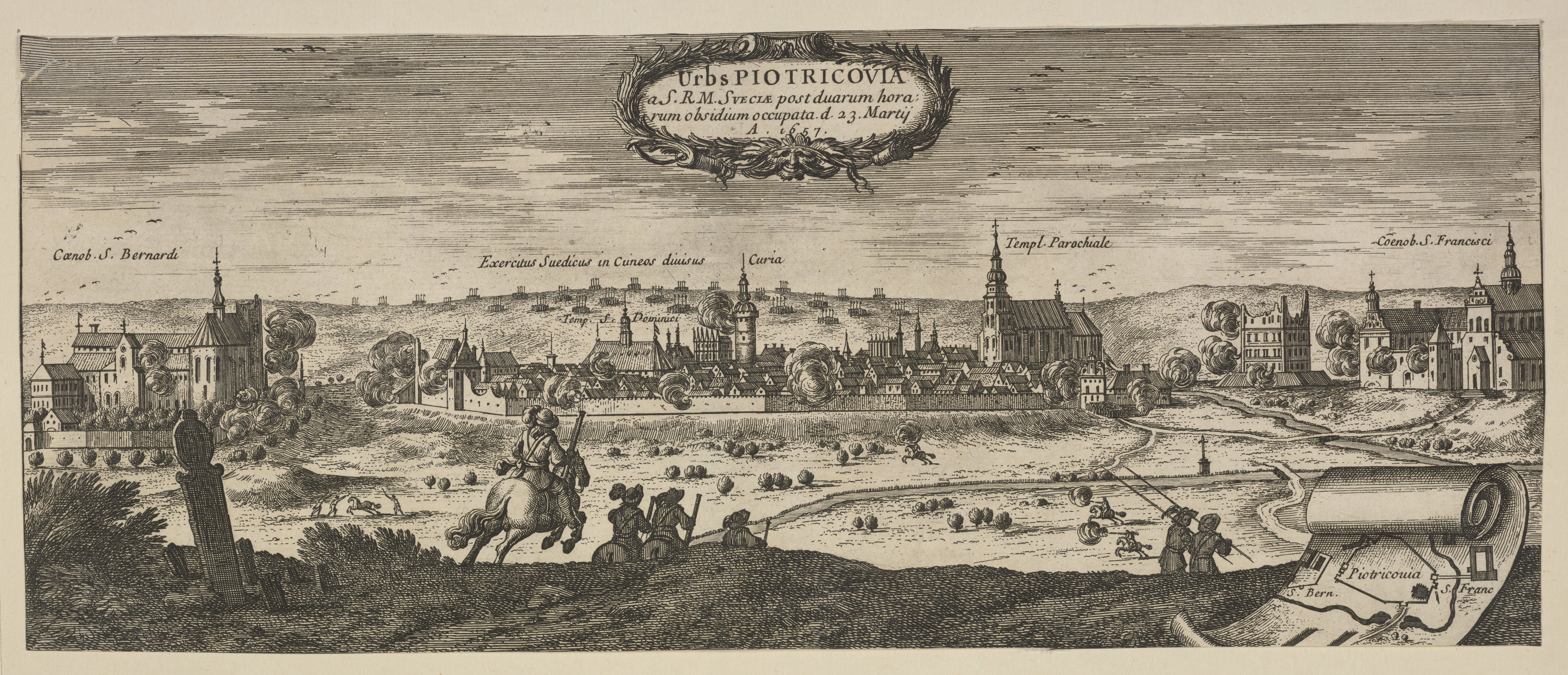
Piotrków in the 17th century

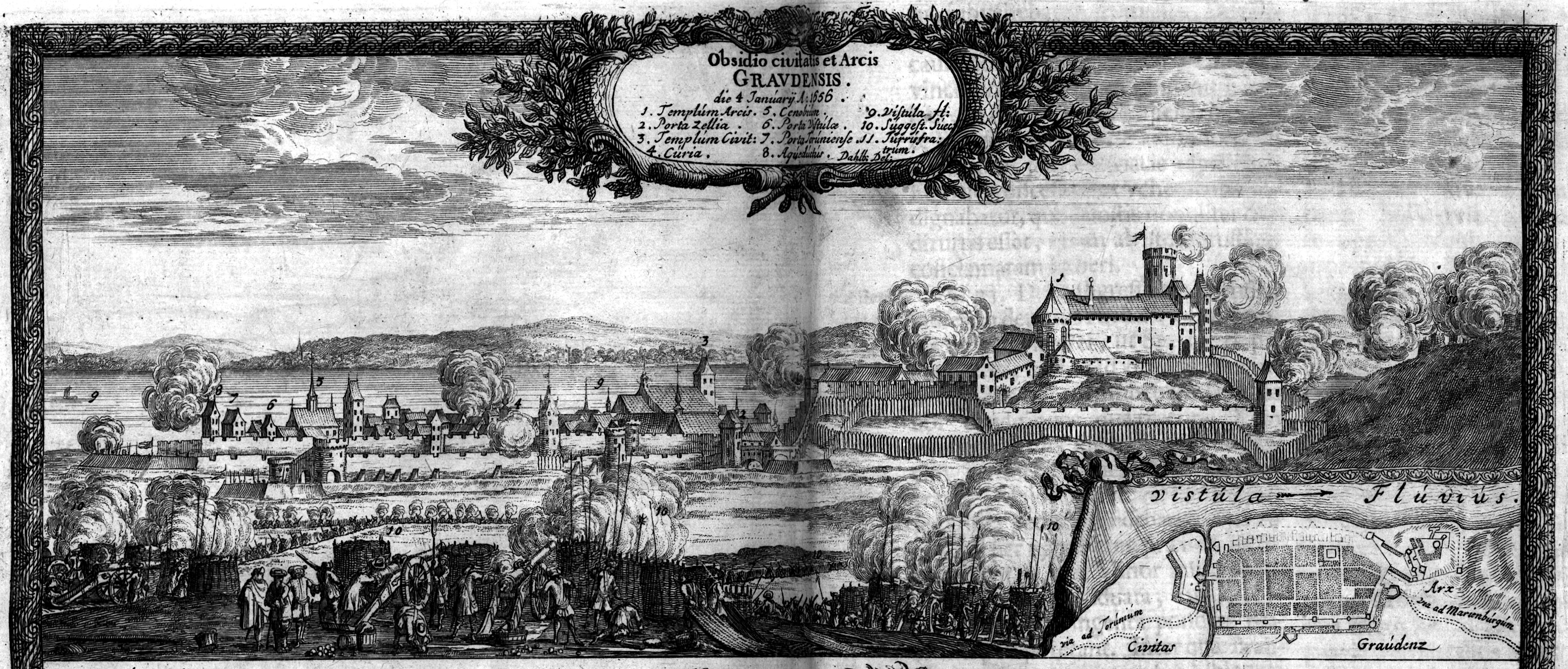
Grudziądz in the 17th century

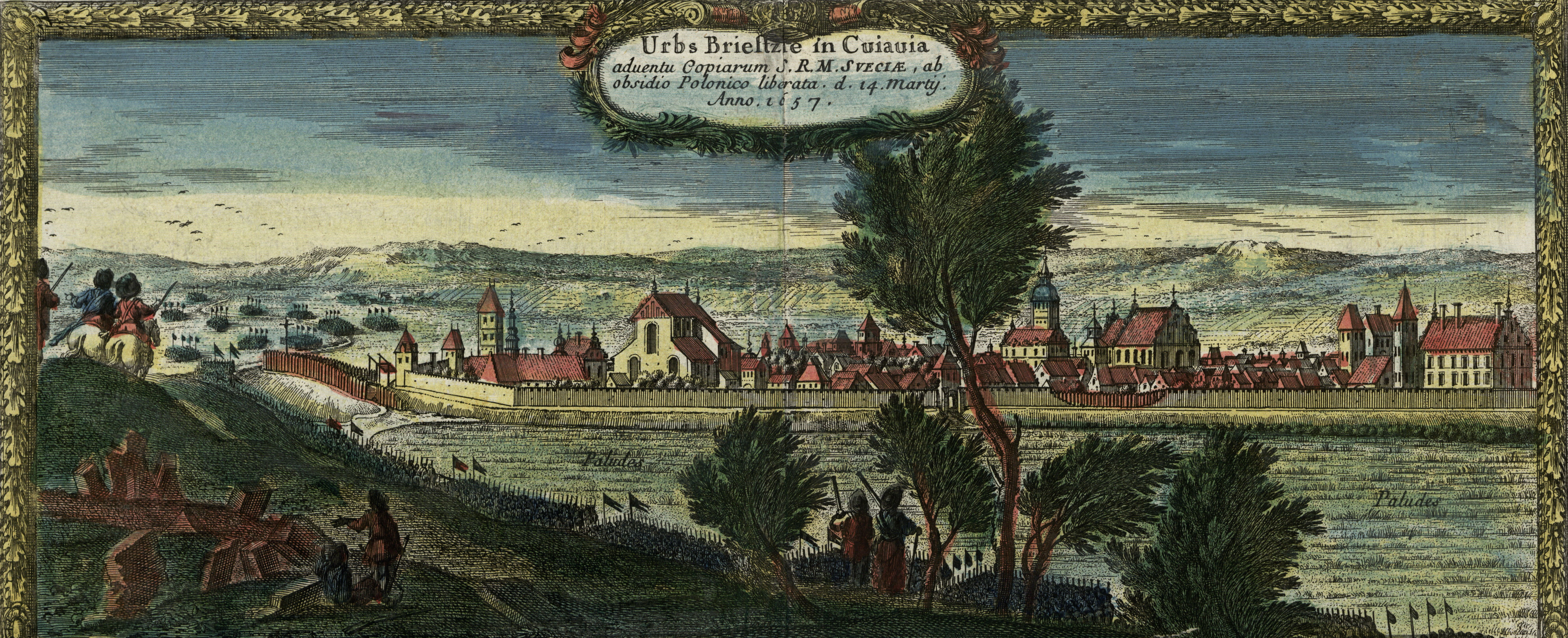
Brześć Kujawski in the 17th century

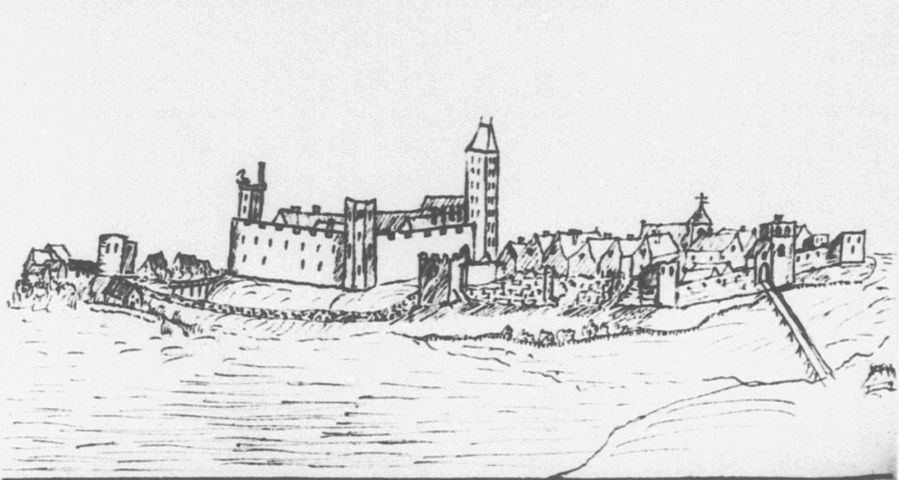
Sztum in the 18th century

- Babimost
- Biały Bór
- Bielsk
- Błonie
- Bobrowniki
- Bolesławiec
- Bolimów
- Brdów
- Brodnica
- Brójce
- Brześć Kujawski
- Budziszewice
- Budzyń
- Bydgoszcz
- Chojnice
- Chorzele
- Ciechanów
- Czaplinek
- Czarne
- Czersk
- Człopa
- Człuchów
- Dąbie
- Dąbrowice
- Debrzno
- Dobrzyń nad Wisłą
- Dzierzgoń
- Elbląg
- Fordon
- Garwolin
- Gąbin
- Gdańsk
- Gębice
- Gniezno
- Gniew
- Gniewkowo
- Golub
- Gostynin
- Goszczyn
- Grabów nad Prosną
- Grójec
- Grudziądz
- Inowłódz
- Inowrocław
- Janowo
- Kalisz
- Kamieńczyk
- Kamion
- Kampinos
- Kcynia
- Kłecko
- Kłodawa
- Kolno
- Koło
- Konin
- Kopanica
- Kościan
- Kościerzyna
- Kowal
- Kowalewo Pomorskie
- Kruszwica
- Latowicz
- Lidzbark
- Lipno
- Liw
- Łasin
- Łęczyca
- Łomża
- Maków Mazowiecki
- Malbork
- Mieścisko
- Międzyrzecz
- Mikstat
- Mława
- Mosina
- Mszczonów
- Nakło nad Notecią
- Nieszawa
- Nowa Brzeźnica
- Nowe
- Nowe Miasto, Płońsk County
- Nowe Miasto Lubawskie
- Nowogród
- Nur
- Oborniki
- Odolanów
- Osieck
- Osmolin
- Ostrołęka
- Ostrów
- Ostrzeszów
- Pajęczno
- Piaseczno
- Piła
- Piotrków
- Płock
- Płońsk
- Pobiedziska
- Podgórz
- Powidz
- Poznań
- Przasnysz
- Przedecz
- Puck
- Pyzdry
- Radomsko
- Radziejów
- Radziłów
- Radzyń
- Rawa
- Rogoźno
- Różan
- Rypin
- Serock
- Sieradz
- Skarszewy
- Skulsk
- Skwierzyna
- Sochaczew
- Sochocin
- Solec
- Stanisławów
- Starogard
- Stawiszyn
- Sulmierzyce
- Szadek
- Szczerców
- Sztum
- Śrem
- Środa
- Świecie
- Tczew
- Tolkmicko
- Toruń
- Tuchola
- Tuszyn
- Ujście
- Wałcz
- Warka
- Warsaw
- Warsaw New Town
- Warta
- Wąsosz
- Wieluń
- Wiskitki
- Wizna
- Wschowa
- Wyszogród
- Zakroczym
- Zambrów
- Zgierz

==== Lesser Poland Province ====
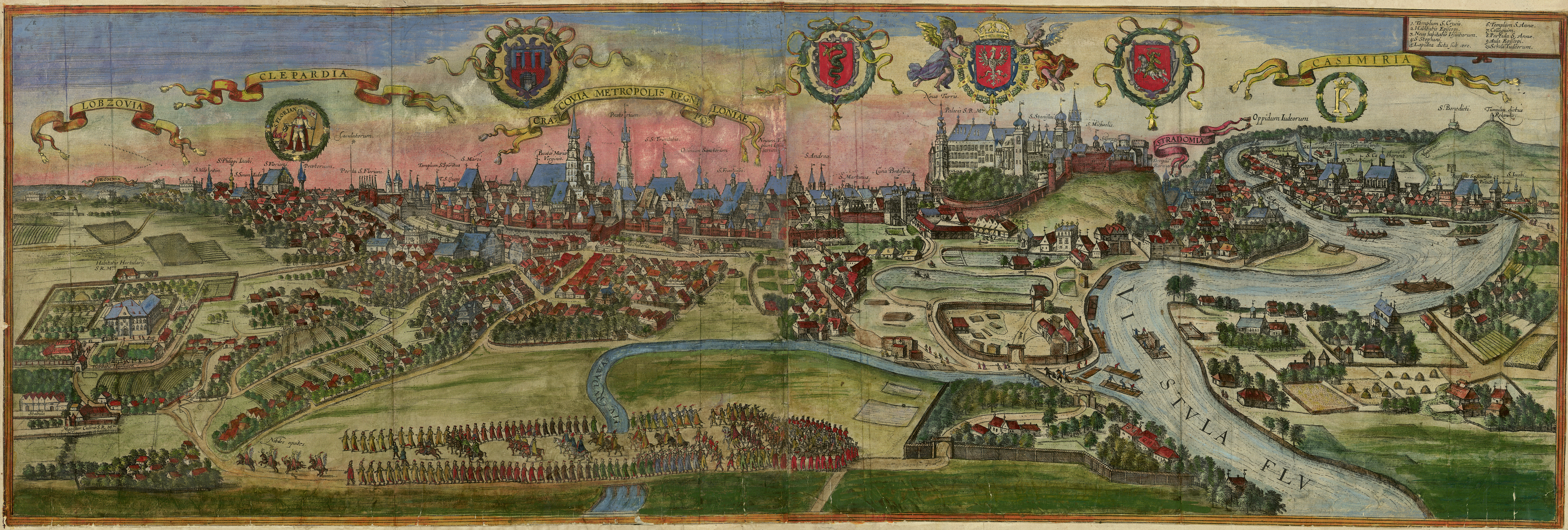
Kraków, Kleparz and Kazimierz in the 17th century - agglomeration of three royal cities

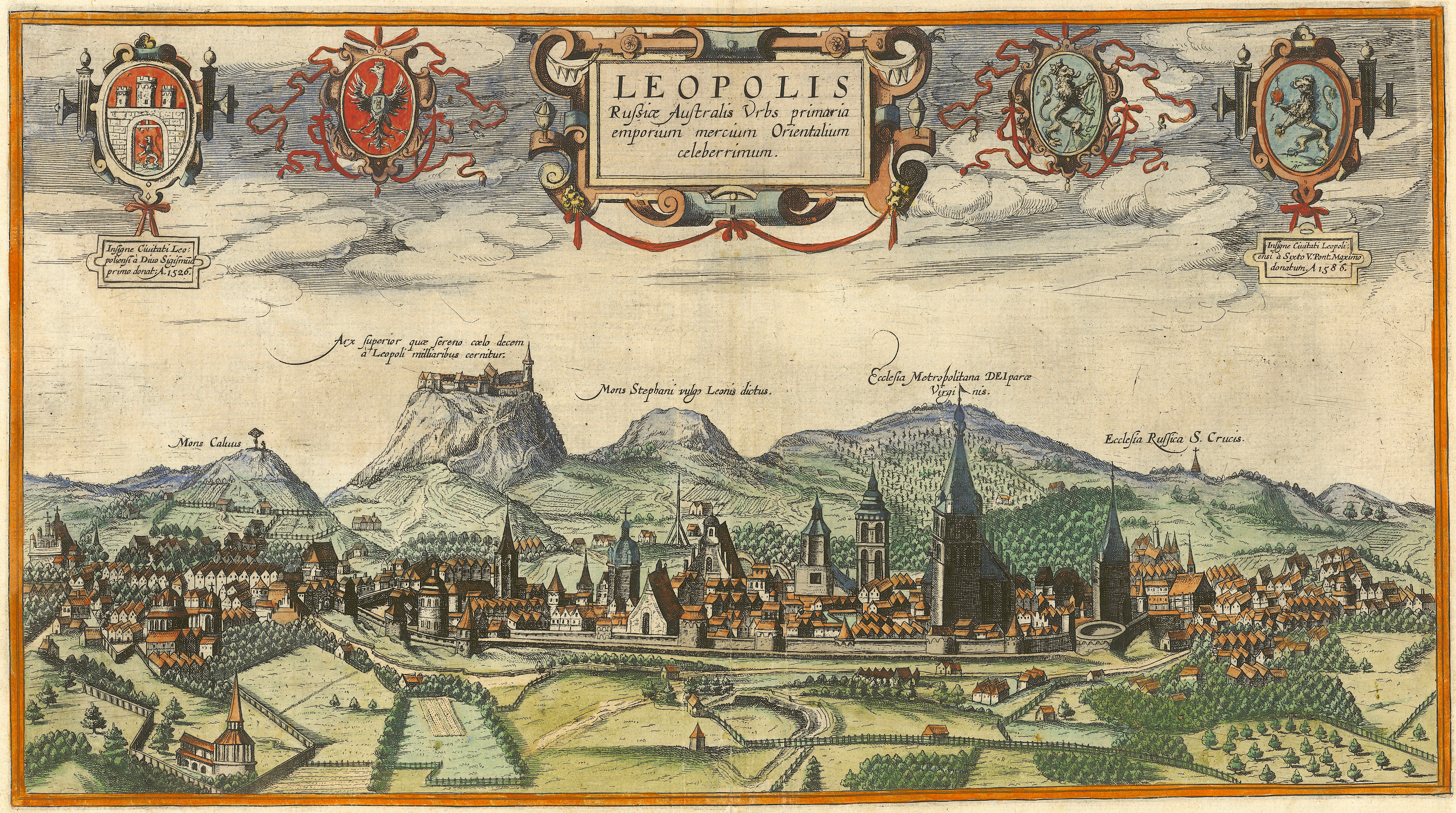
Lwów in the 17th century

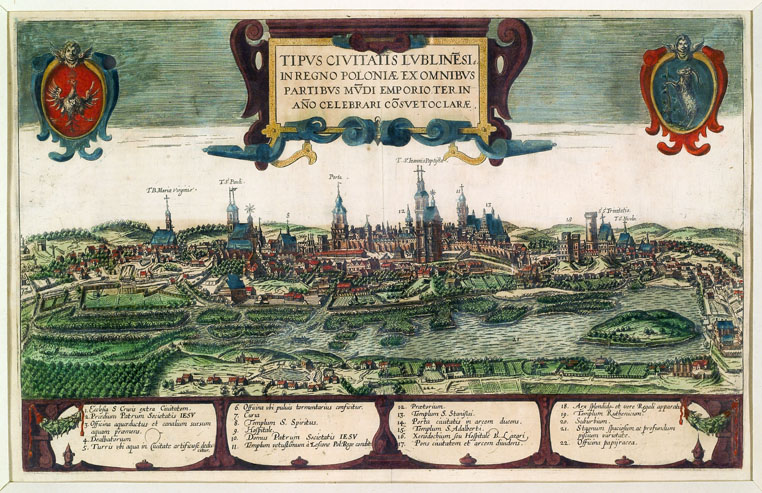
Lublin in the 17th century

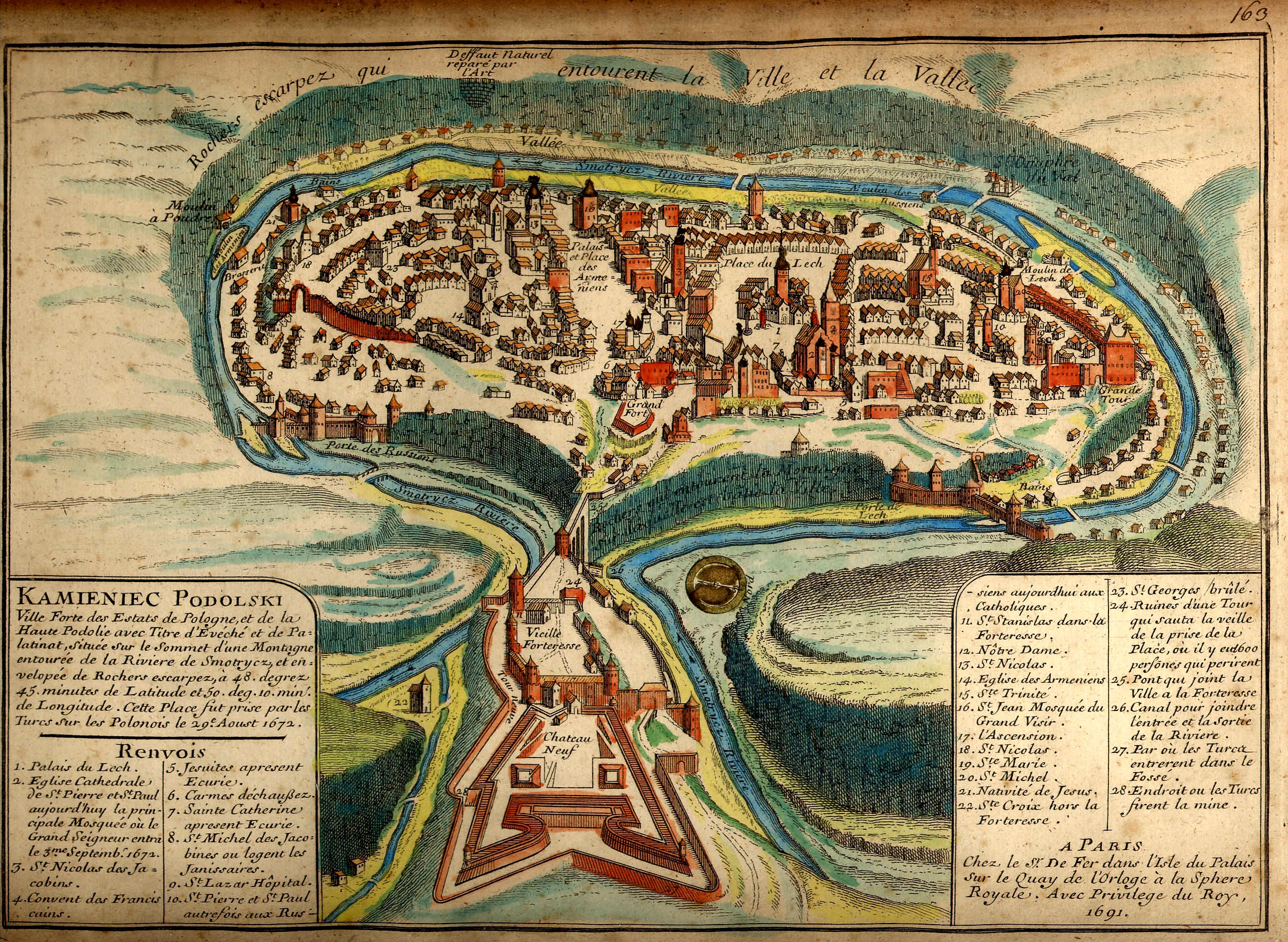
Kamieniec Podolski in the 17th century

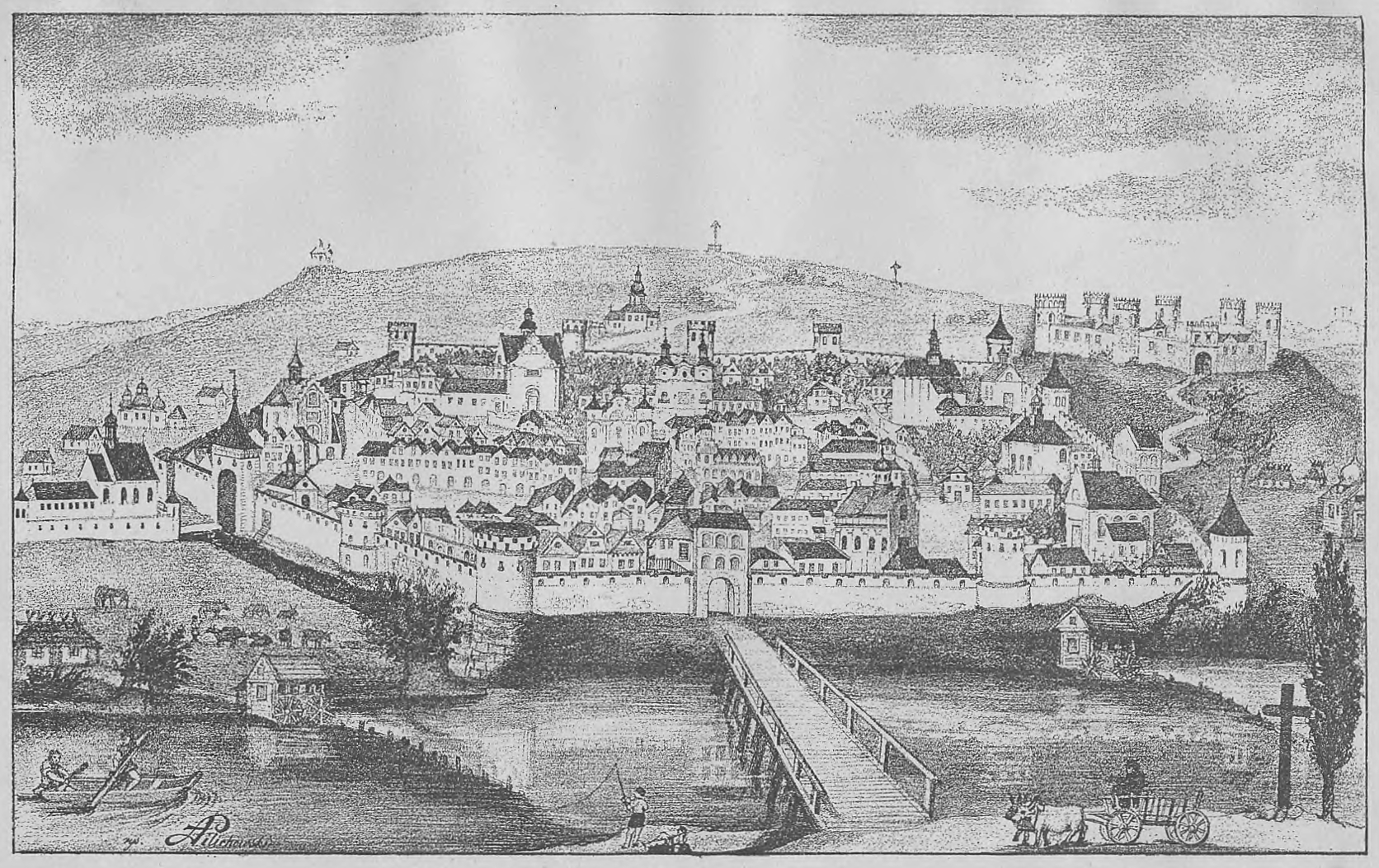
Przemyśl in the 17th century

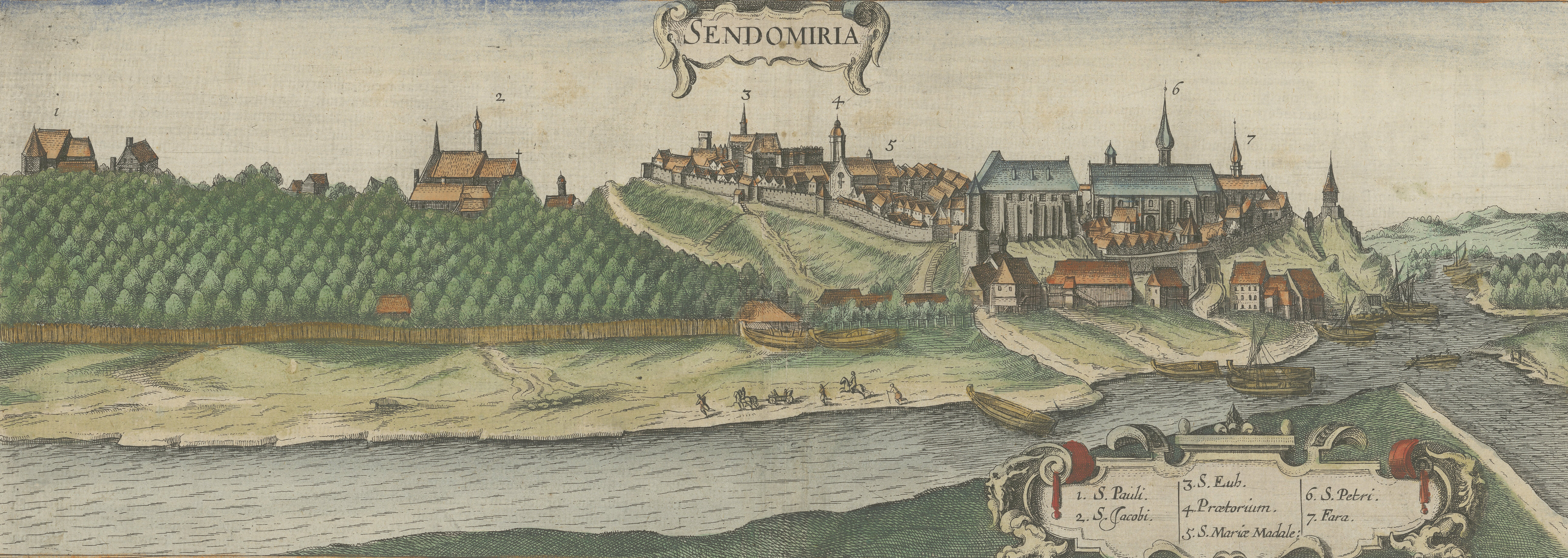
Sandomierz in the 17th century

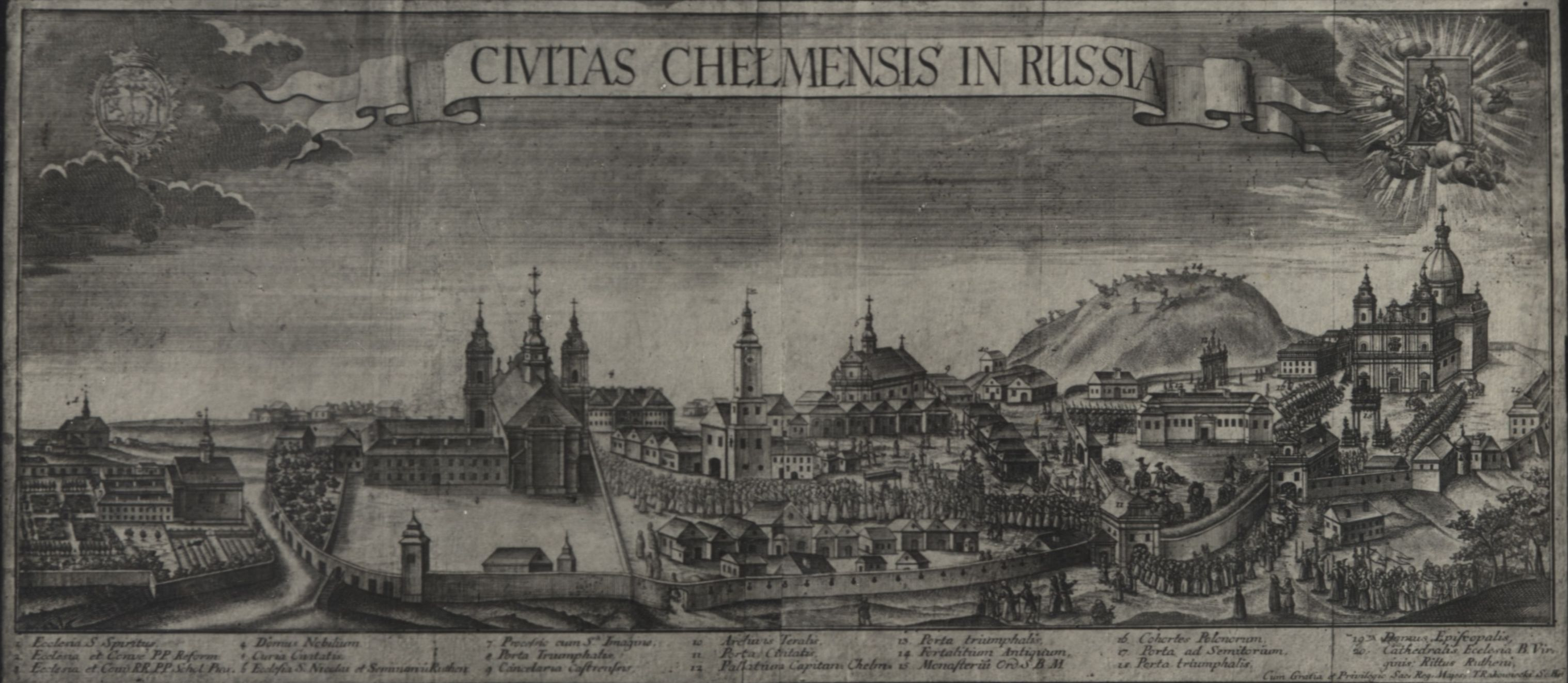
Chełm in the 17th century

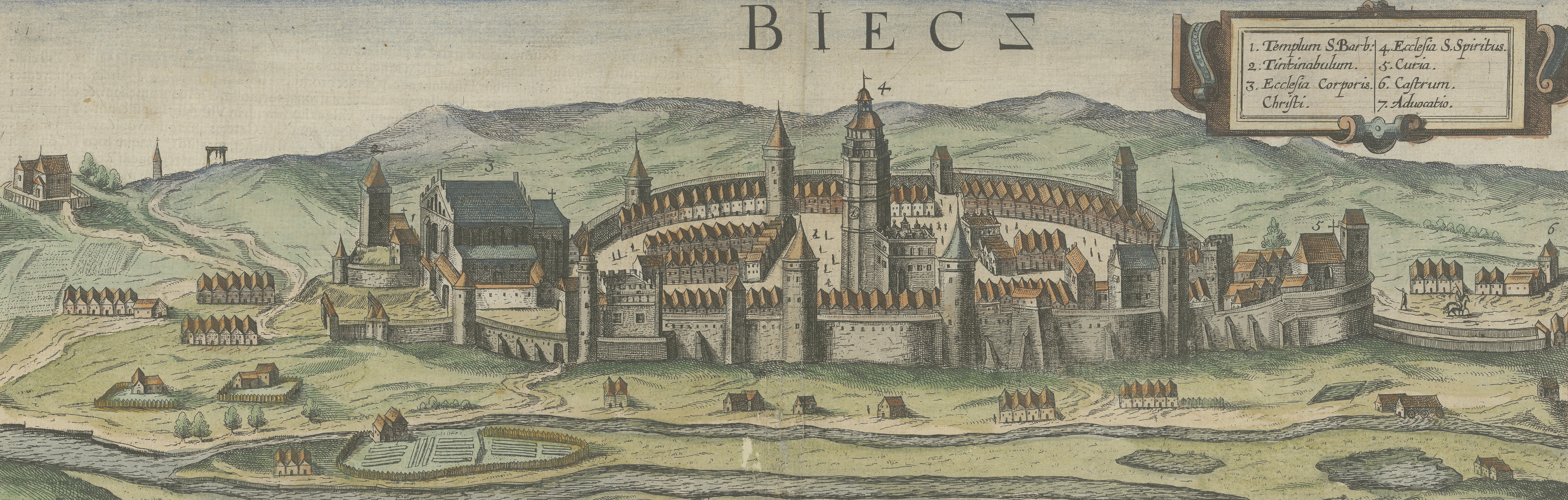
Biecz in the 17th century

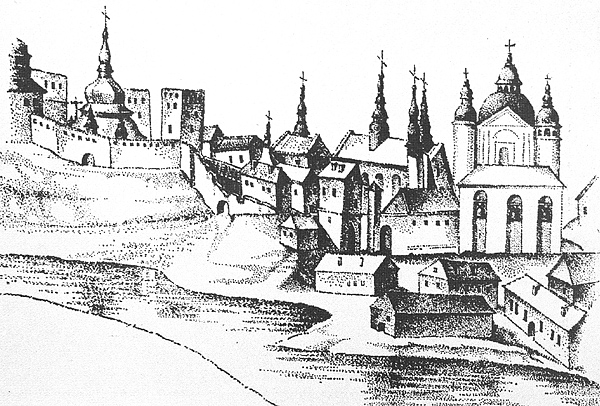
Łuck in the 18th century

- Augustów
- Bar (today part of Ukraine)
- Bełz (today part of Ukraine)
- Berezań (today part of Ukraine)
- Będzin
- Bila Tserkva (today part of Ukraine)
- Biecz
- Bielsk
- Bobrovytsia (today part of Ukraine)
- Bohuslav (today part of Ukraine)
- Bracław (today part of Ukraine)
- Brańsk
- Busk (today part of Ukraine)
- Chełm
- Chęciny
- Chmielnik
- Chmielnik (today part of Ukraine)
- Chyhyryn (today part of Ukraine)
- Czerkasy (today part of Ukraine)
- Chervonohorod (today part of Ukraine)
- Częstochowa
- Dobrotvir (today part of Ukraine)
- Drohiczyn
- Dubienka
- Goniądz
- Grabowiec
- Grybów
- Haisyn (today part of Ukraine)
- Horodło
- Yahotyn (today part of Ukraine)
- Yaltushkiv (today part of Ukraine)
- Kamieniec Podolski (today part of Ukraine)
- Kaniv (today part of Ukraine)
- Kazimierz
- Kazimierz Dolny
- Kęty
- Kijów (today part of Ukraine)
- Kleparz
- Kleszczele
- Kłobuck
- Knyszyn
- Korsuń (today part of Ukraine)
- Koszyce
- Kowel (today part of Ukraine)
- Kozienice
- Kraków
- Krasnystaw
- Kremenets (today part of Ukraine)
- Krzepice
- Lanckorona
- Letychiv (today part of Ukraine)
- Lelów
- Leżajsk
- Lityn (today part of Ukraine)
- Lubaczów
- Liubech (today part of Ukraine)
- Lublin
- Luboml (today part of Ukraine)
- Lwów (today part of Ukraine)
- Łosice
- Łuck (today part of Ukraine)
- Łuków
- Małogoszcz
- Mielnik
- Mościska (today part of Ukraine)
- Mylianovychi (today part of Ukraine)
- Myrhorod (today part of Ukraine)
- Narew
- Nova Ushytsia (today part of Ukraine)
- Nowy Korczyn
- Nowy Sącz
- Nowy Targ
- Olkusz
- Olsztyn
- Opoczno
- Osiek
- Oster (today part of Ukraine)
- Oświęcim
- Ovruch (today part of Ukraine)
- Parczew
- Pereiaslav (today part of Ukraine)
- Pierzchnica
- Pilzno
- Piwniczna
- Podgórze
- Połaniec
- Potelych (today part of Ukraine)
- Płoskirów (today part of Ukraine)
- Proszowice
- Przedbórz
- Przemyśl
- Radom
- Radoszyce
- Rajgród
- Ratno (today part of Ukraine)
- Rohatyn (today part of Ukraine)
- Ropczyce
- Ryczywół
- Sambor (today part of Ukraine)
- Sandomierz
- Sanok
- Szczurowice (today part of Ukraine)
- Słomniki
- Smotrycz (today part of Ukraine)
- Sokal (today part of Ukraine)
- Solec nad Wisłą
- Stebliv (today part of Ukraine)
- Stężyca
- Stopnica
- Stoianiv (today part of Ukraine)
- Stary Sambor (today part of Ukraine)
- Stryj (today part of Ukraine)
- Suraż
- Świniuchy (today part of Ukraine)
- Szydłów
- Trakhtemyriv (today part of Ukraine)
- Tykocin
- Tymbark
- Tyszowce
- Ulaniv (today part of Ukraine)
- Urzędów
- Uście Solne
- Velyki Mosty (today part of Ukraine)
- Vinnytsia (today part of Ukraine)
- Vyshnivka (today part of Ukraine)
- Wąwolnica
- Wieliczka
- Wiślica
- Włodzimierz (today part of Ukraine)
- Wolbrom
- Zbuczyn
- Zvenyhorodka (today part of Ukraine)
- Zwoleń
- Żydaczów (today part of Ukraine)
- Żytomierz (today part of Ukraine)

=== Grand Duchy of Lithuania ===
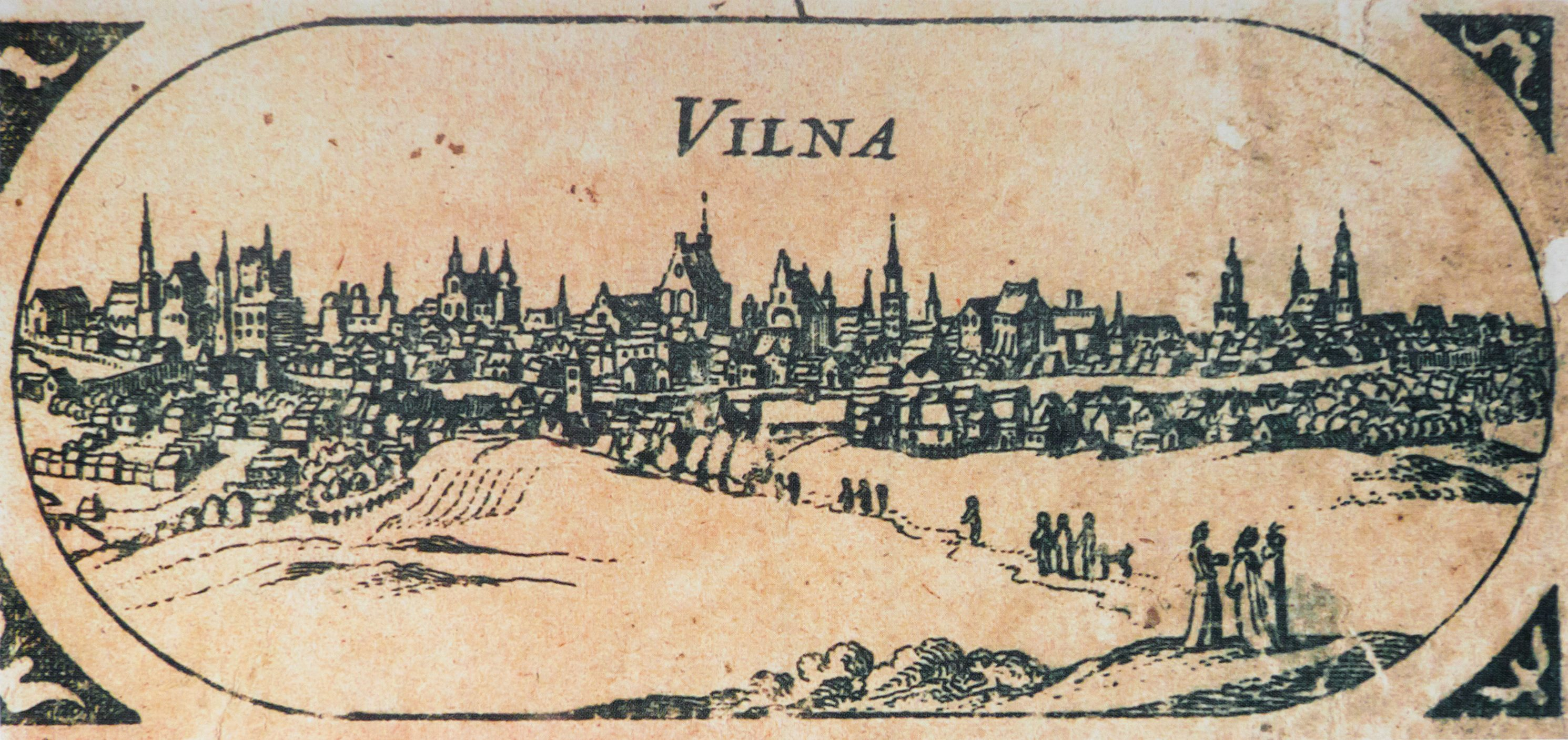
Vilnius in the 17th century

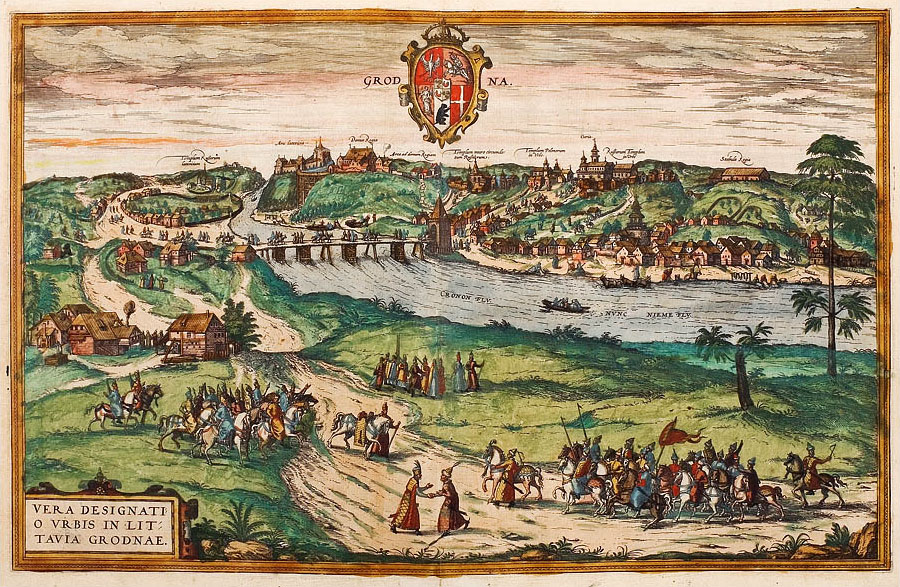
Grodno in the 16th century

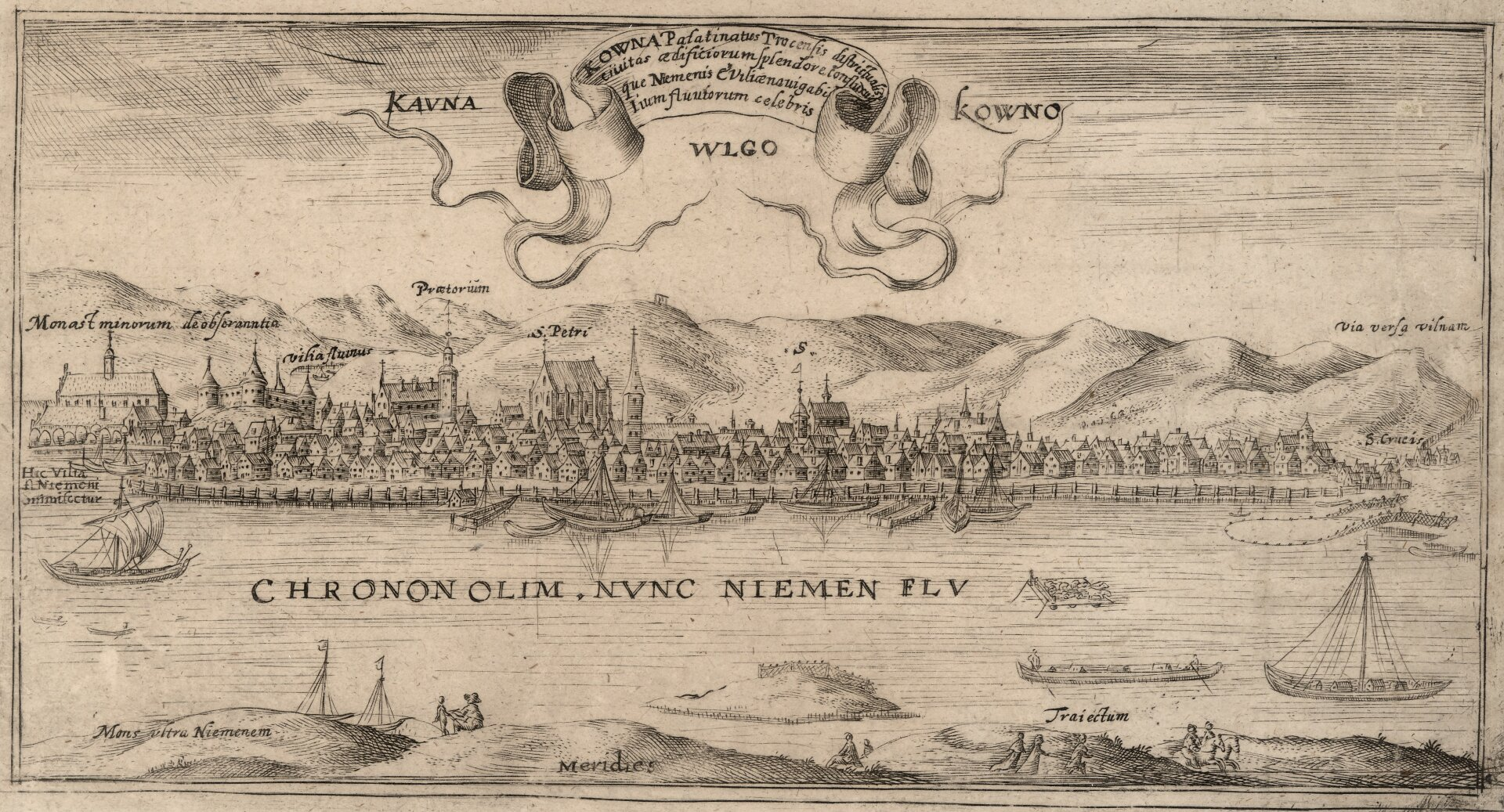
Kaunas in the 17th century

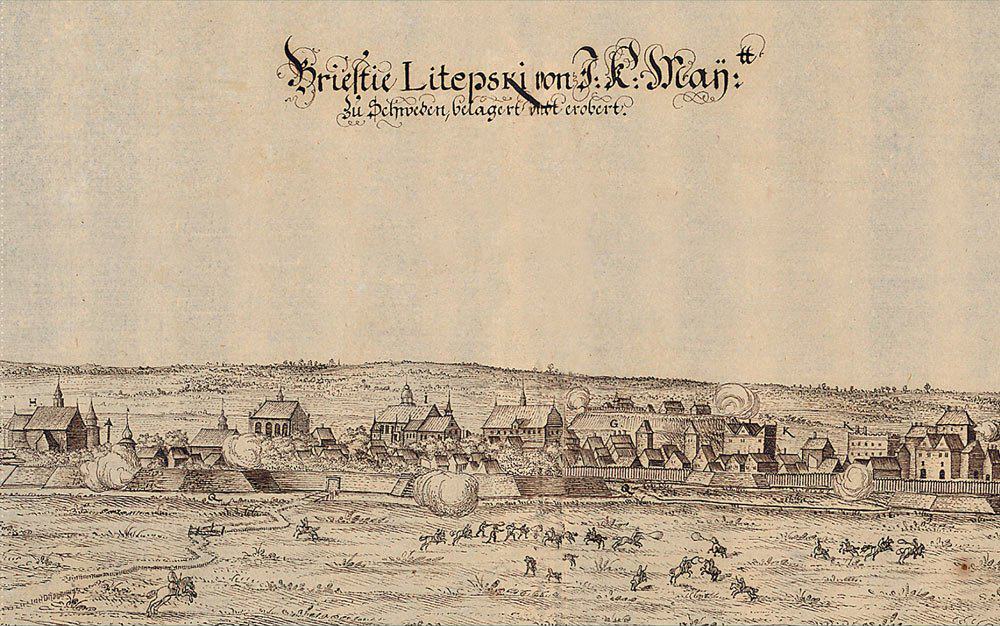
Brest in the 17th century

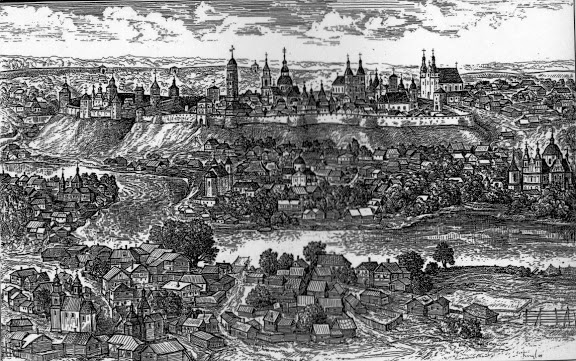
Mogilev in the 18th century

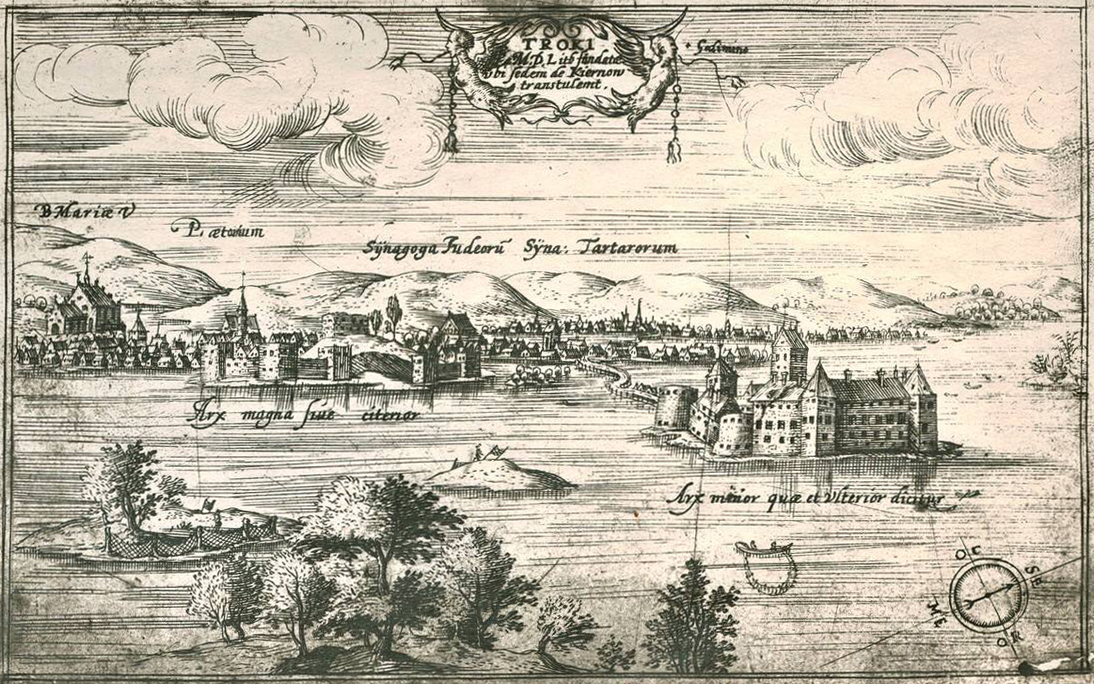
Trakai in the 17th century

- Adelsk (today part of Belarus)
- Astryna (today part of Belarus)
- Azarychy (today part of Belarus)
- Azyory (today part of Belarus)
- Berżniki (today part of Poland)
- Babruysk (today part of Belarus)
- Braslaw (today part of Belarus)
- Brest (today part of Belarus)
- Chachersk (today part of Belarus)
- Chavusy (today part of Belarus)
- Cherykaw (today part of Belarus)
- Druskininkai
- Drysa (today part of Belarus)
- Drysvyaty (today part of Belarus)
- Dyvin (today part of Belarus)
- Dzisna (today part of Belarus)
- Eišiškės
- Filipów (today part of Poland)
- Gomel (today part of Belarus)
- Grodno (today part of Belarus)
- Haradnaya (today part of Belarus)
- Hieraniony (today part of Belarus)
- Hozha (today part of Belarus)
- Jałówka (today part of Poland)
- Janów (today part of Poland)
- Jeleniewo (today part of Poland)
- Jurbarkas
- Kalinkavichy (today part of Belarus)
- Kamyenyets (today part of Belarus)
- Kaunas
- Khotsimsk (today part of Belarus)
- Kletsk (today part of Belarus)
- Klichaw (today part of Belarus)
- Kobryn (today part of Belarus)
- Korycin (today part of Poland)
- Krasnapolle (today part of Belarus)
- Krasnopol (today part of Poland)
- Krynki (today part of Poland)
- Krychaw (today part of Belarus)
- Lahishyn (today part of Belarus)
- Lazdijai
- Lida (today part of Belarus)
- Lipnishki (today part of Belarus)
- Lunna (today part of Belarus)
- Łomazy (today part of Poland)
- Malyech (today part of Belarus)
- Masty (today part of Belarus)
- Mazyr (today part of Belarus)
- Milejczyce (today part of Poland)
- Minsk (today part of Belarus)
- Mogilev (today part of Belarus)
- Motal (today part of Belarus)
- Mstsibava (today part of Belarus)
- Mstsislaw (today part of Belarus)
- Myadzyel (today part of Belarus)
- Novy Dvor (today part of Belarus)
- Opsa (today part of Belarus)
- Orsha (today part of Belarus)
- Parychy (today part of Belarus)
- Pinsk (today part of Belarus)
- Piszczac (today part of Poland)
- Polotsk (today part of Belarus)
- Porazava (today part of Belarus)
- Prapoysk (today part of Belarus)
- Pruzhany (today part of Belarus)
- Przerośl (today part of Poland)
- Pyerabroddzye (today part of Belarus)
- Pryvalki (today part of Belarus)
- Radashkovichy (today part of Belarus)
- Radun (today part of Belarus)
- Rahachow (today part of Belarus)
- Rechytsa (today part of Belarus)
- Sharashova (today part of Belarus)
- Skidzyel’ (today part of Belarus)
- Sokółka (today part of Poland)
- Suchowola (today part of Poland)
- Suraż (today part of Belarus)
- Szczebra (today part of Poland)
- Šventoji
- Traby (today part of Belarus)
- Trakai
- Usvyaty (today part of Russia)
- Vasilishki (today part of Belarus)
- Vawkavysk (today part of Belarus)
- Velizh (today part of Russia)
- Vilnius
- Virbalis
- Vištytis
- Vitebsk (today part of Belarus)
- Vladislavovas
- Voŭpa (today part of Belarus)
- Wasilków (today part of Poland)
- Wiżajny (today part of Poland)
- Wohyń (today part of Poland)

== Royal castles and residences ==
Examples of Polish royal castles and residences found in former royal cities of Poland:

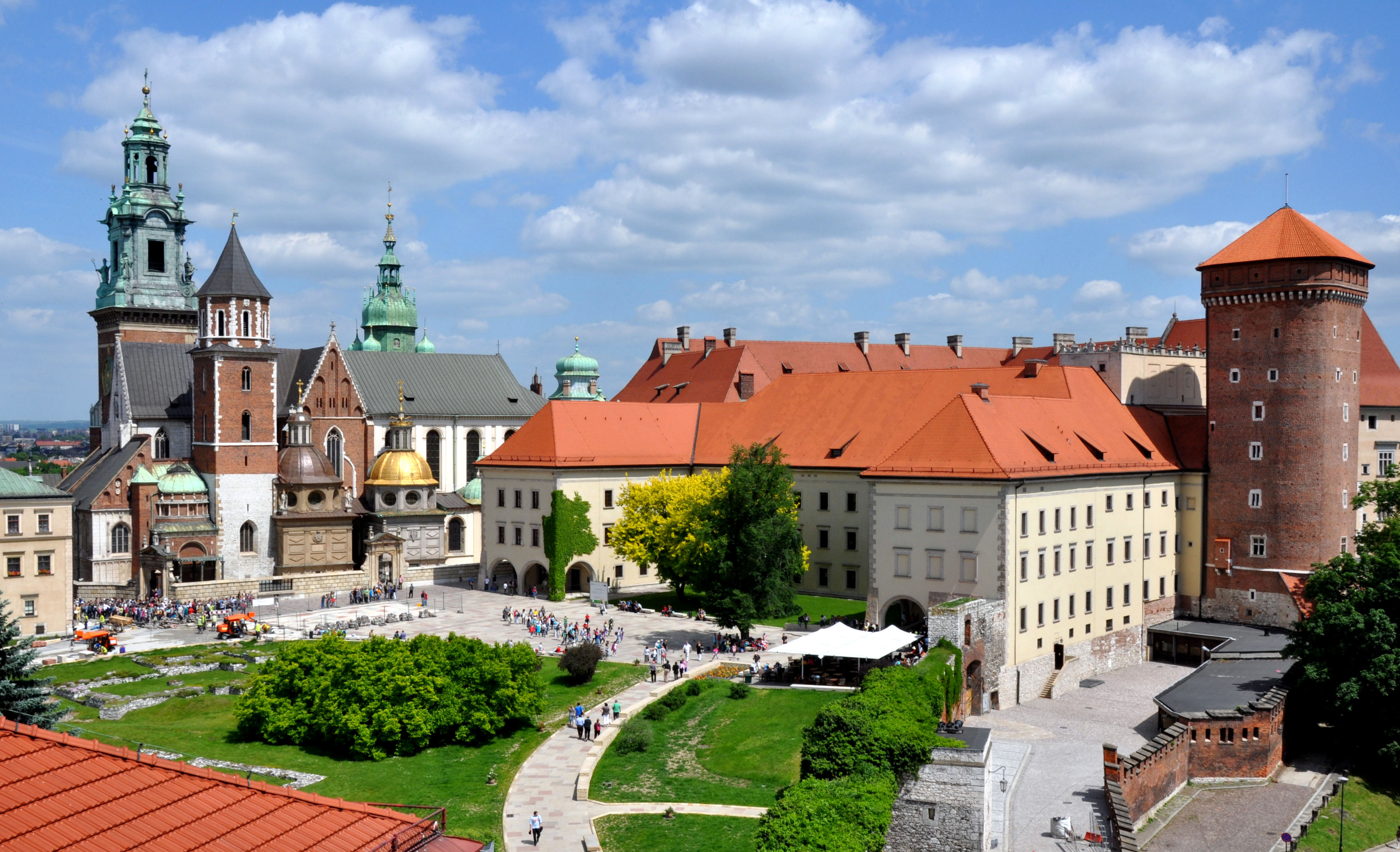
Wawel Castle, Kraków (World Heritage Site)

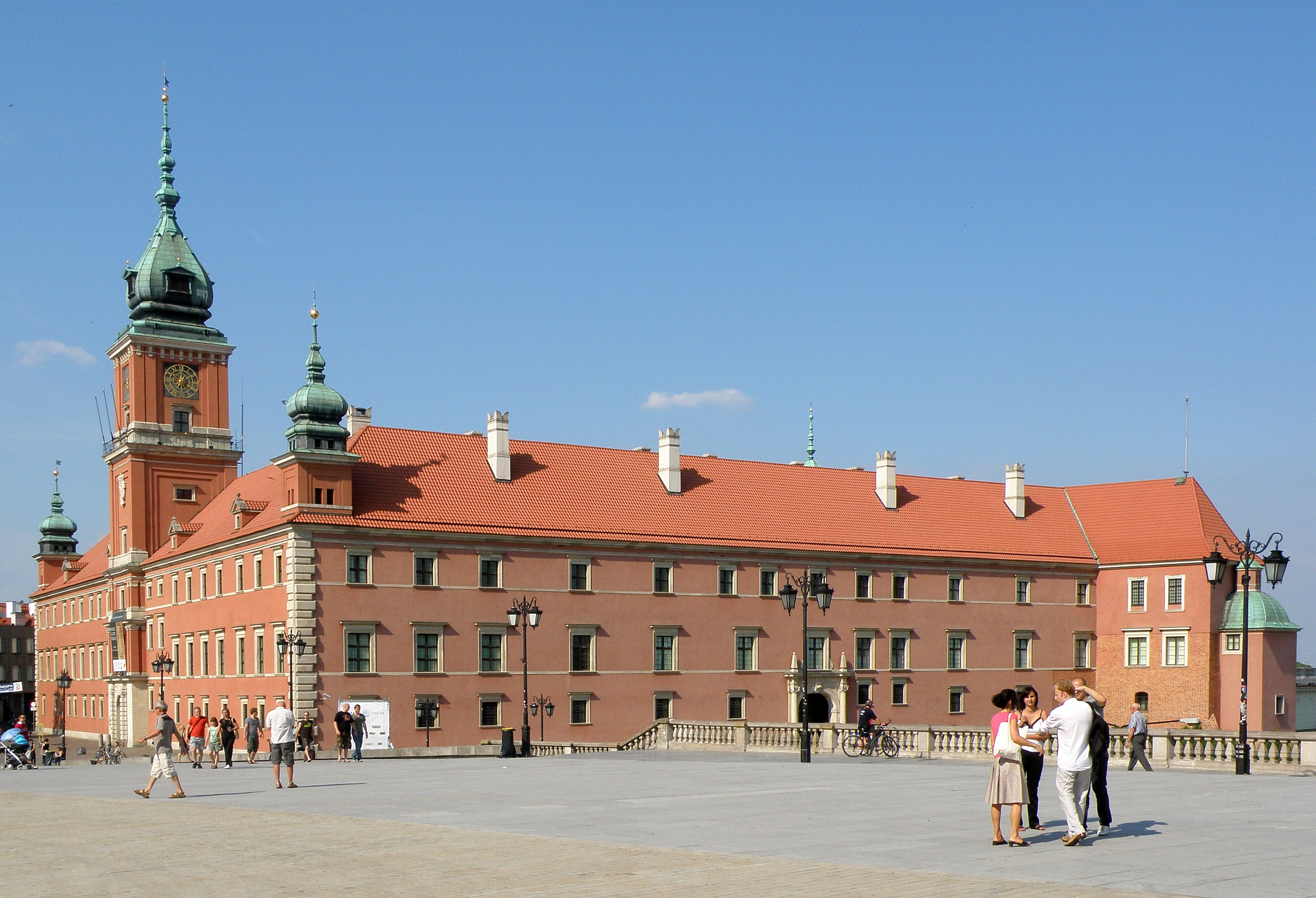
Royal Castle, Warsaw (World Heritage Site)

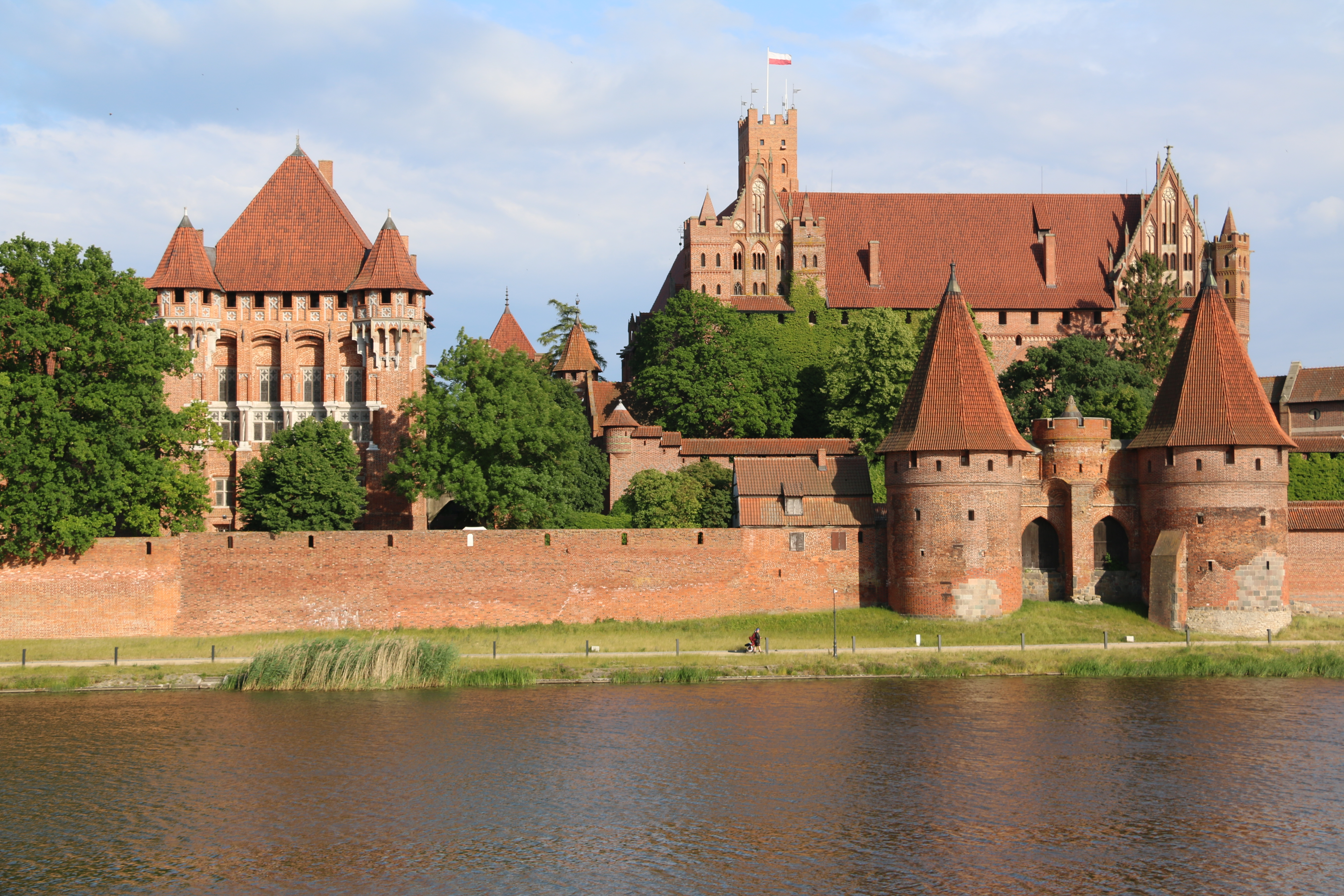
Royal Castle, Malbork (World Heritage Site)

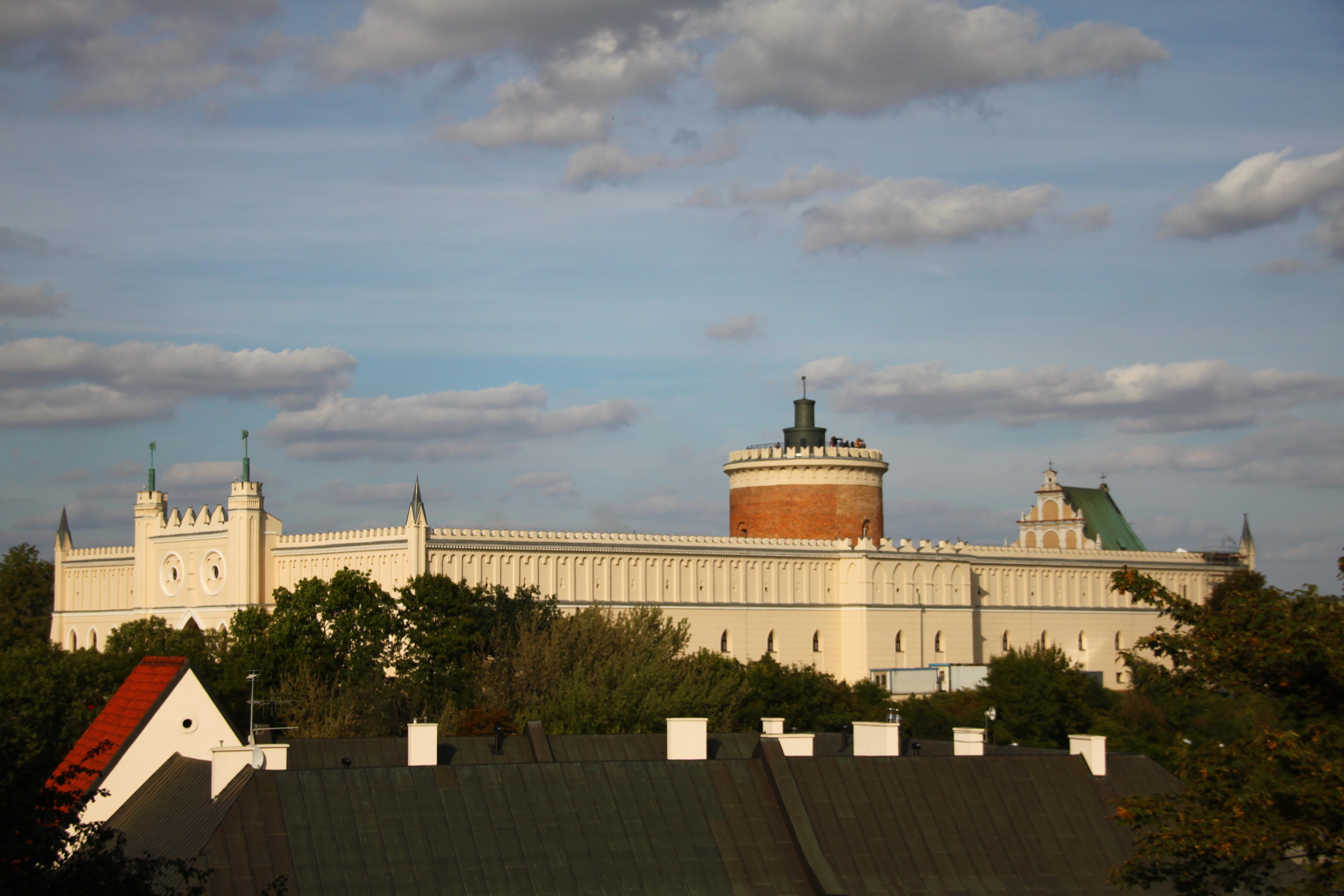
Royal Castle, Lublin

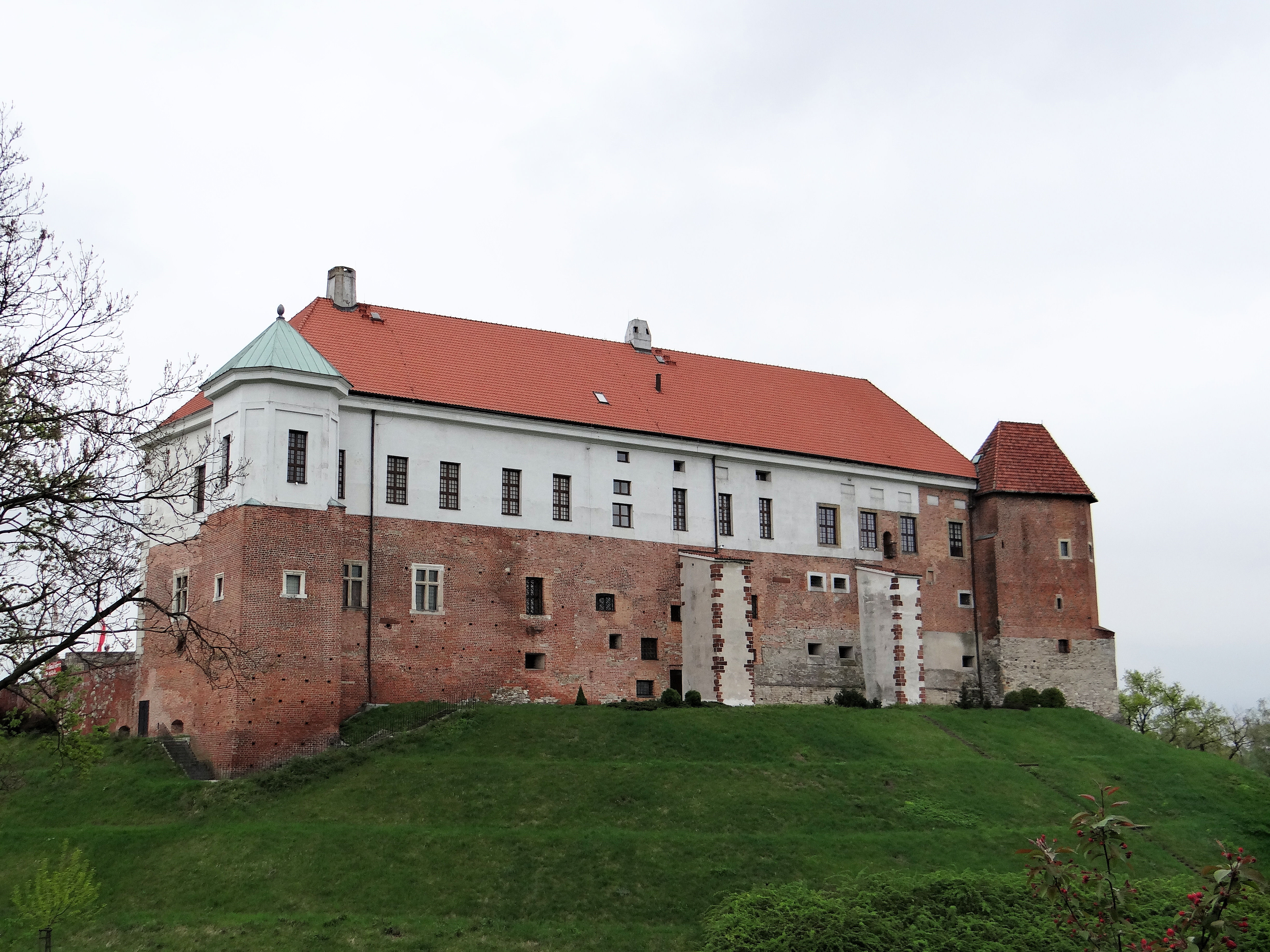
Royal Castle, Sandomierz

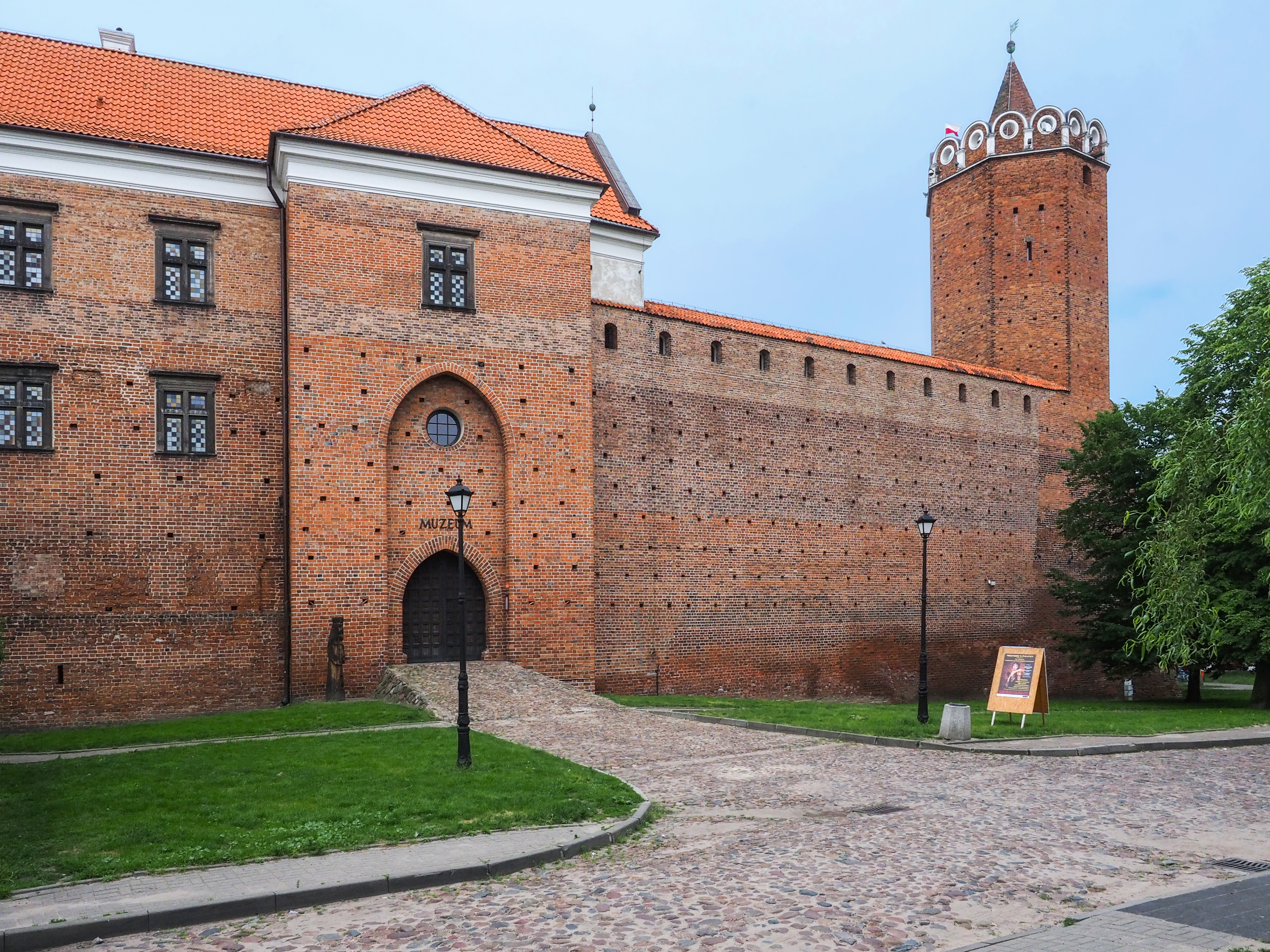
Royal Castle, Łęczyca

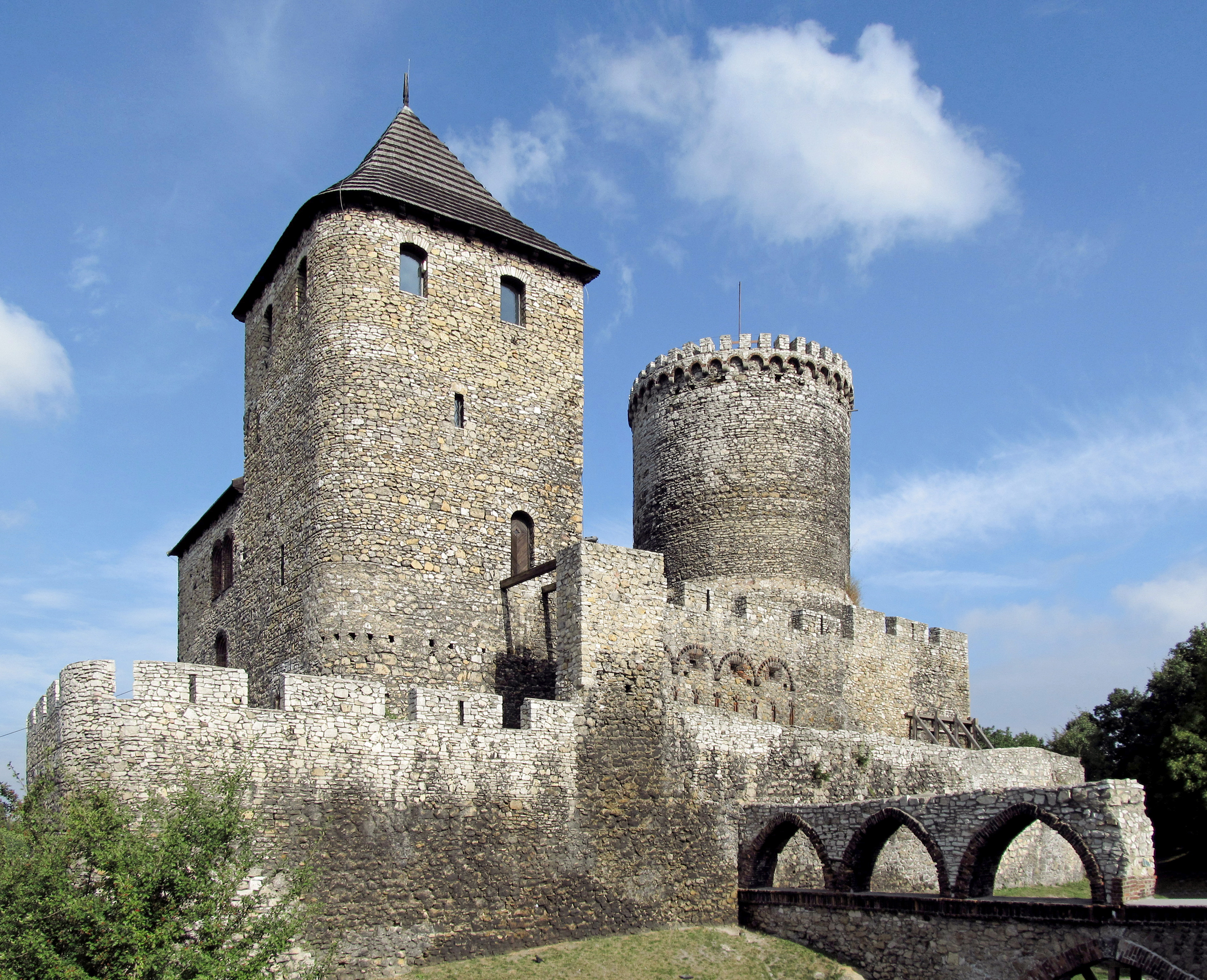
Royal Castle, Będzin

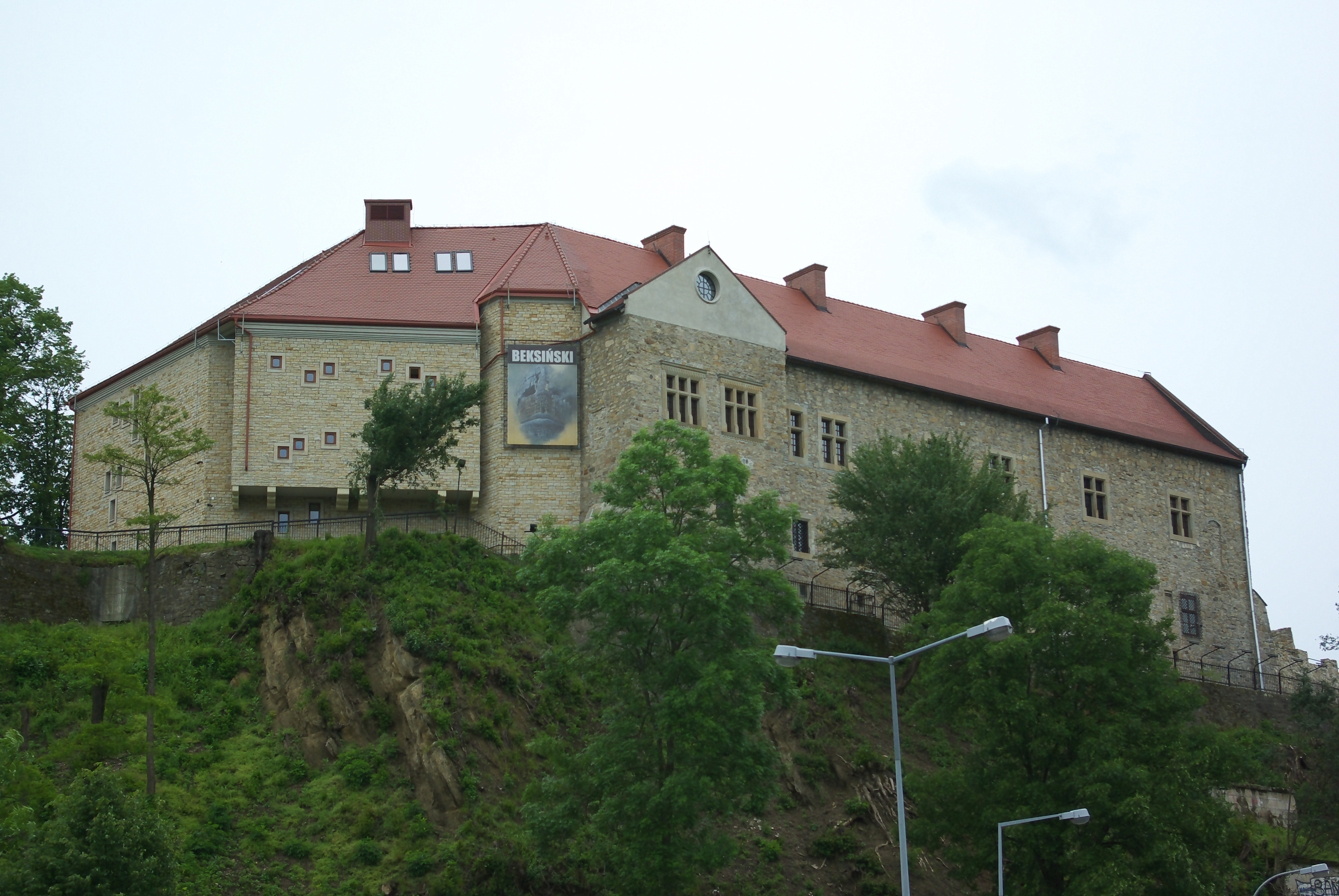
Royal Castle, Sanok

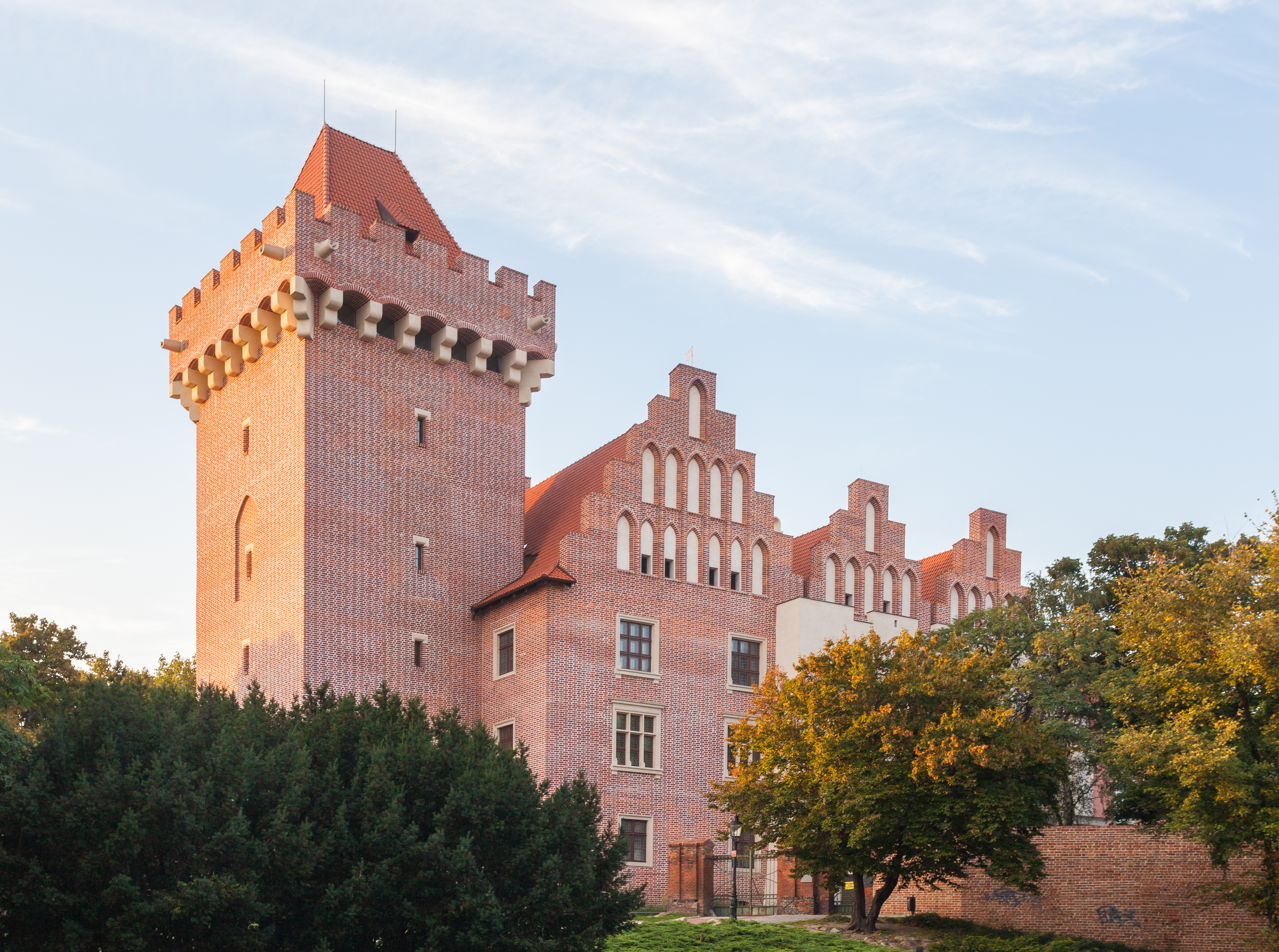
Royal Castle, Poznań

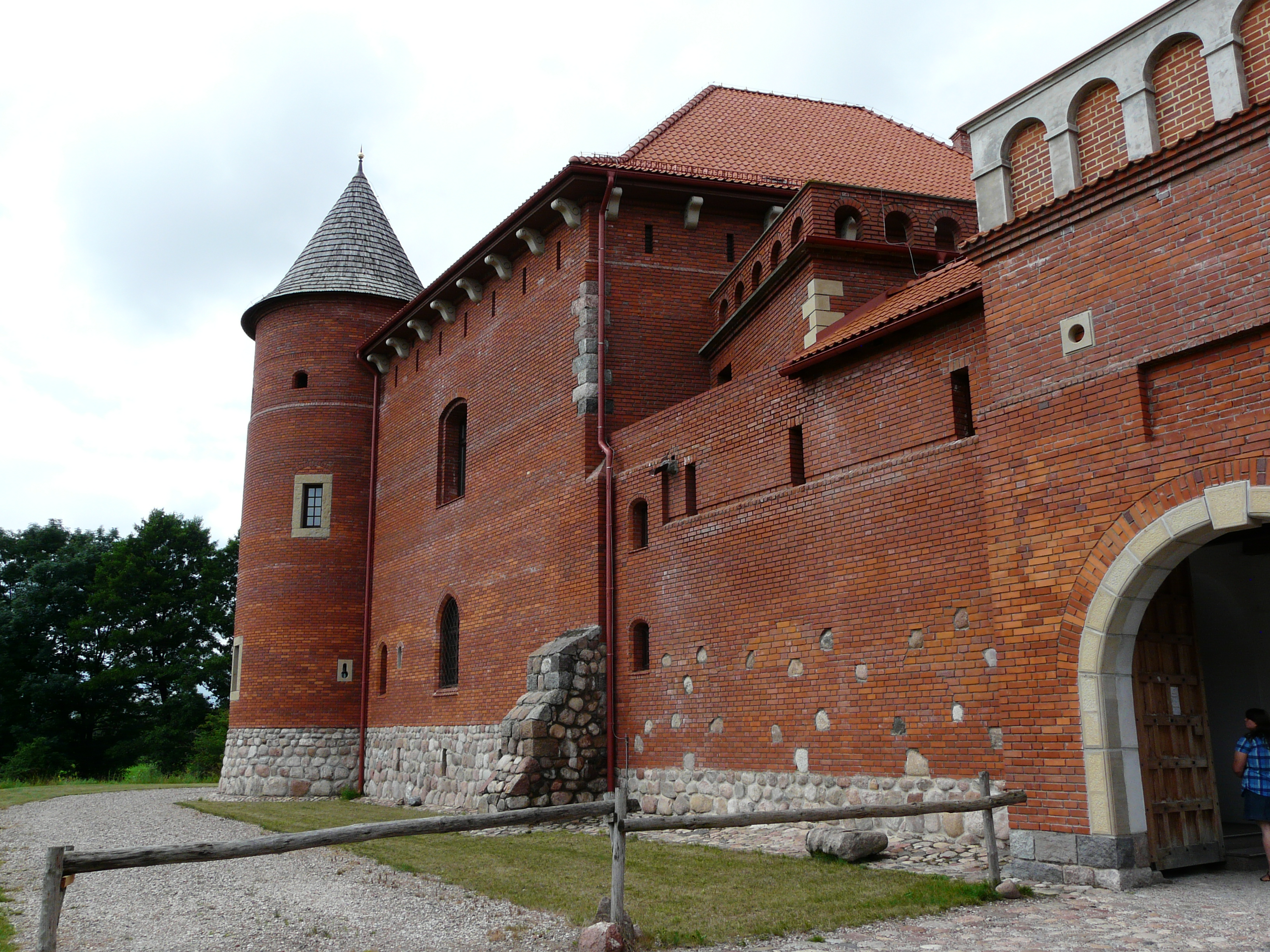
Royal Castle, Tykocin

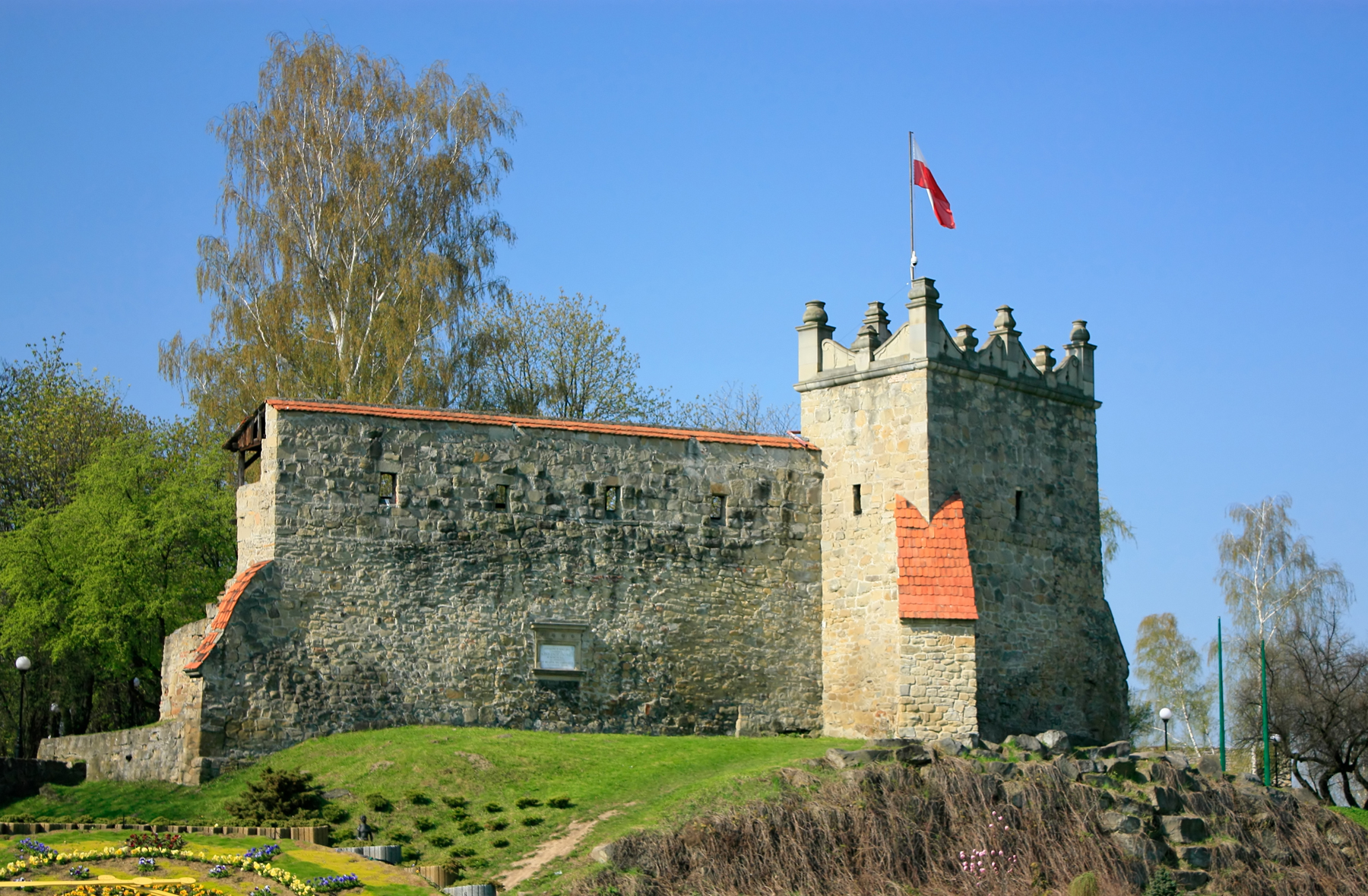
Remainings of the Royal Castle, Nowy Sącz

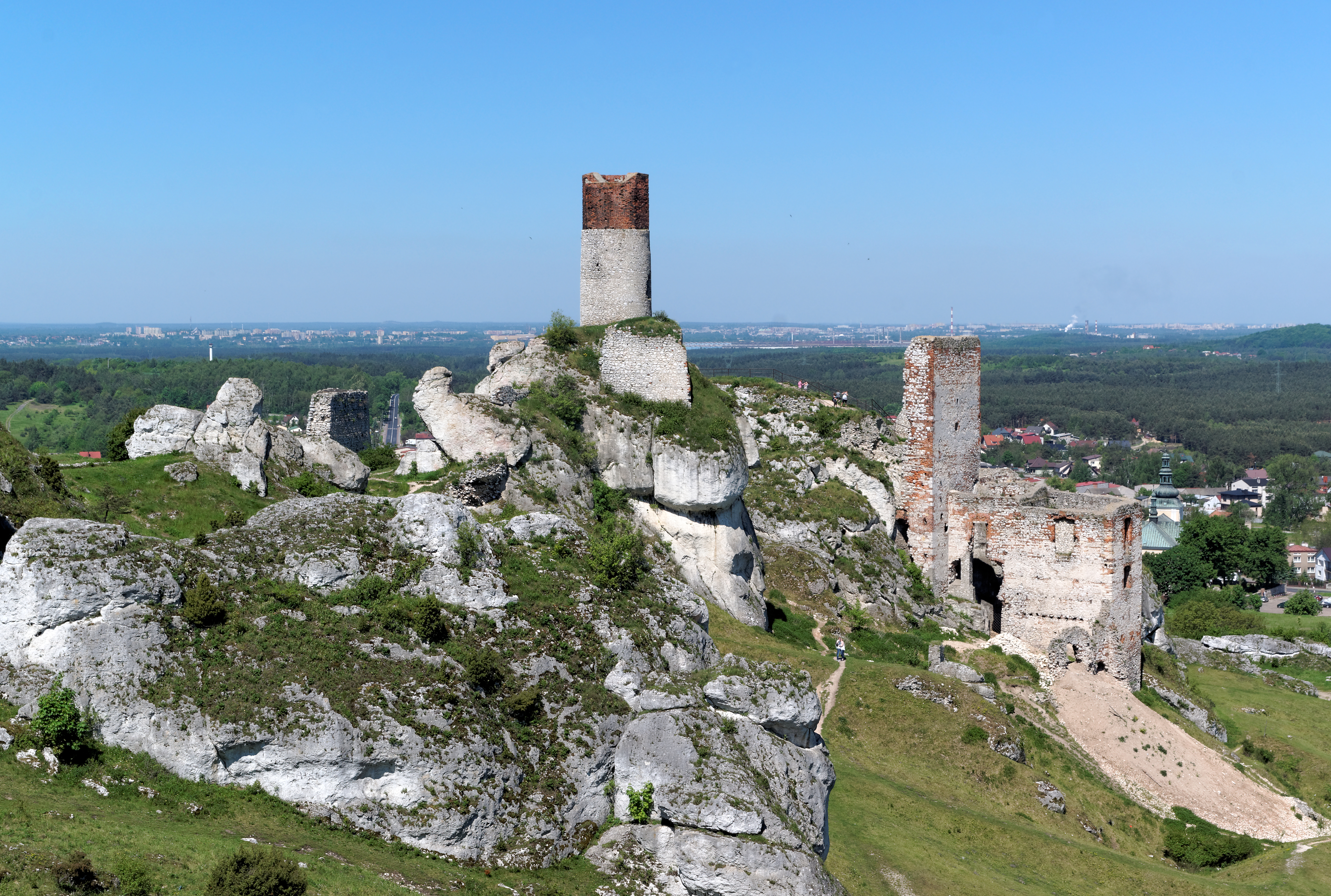
Remainings of the Royal Castle, Olsztyn

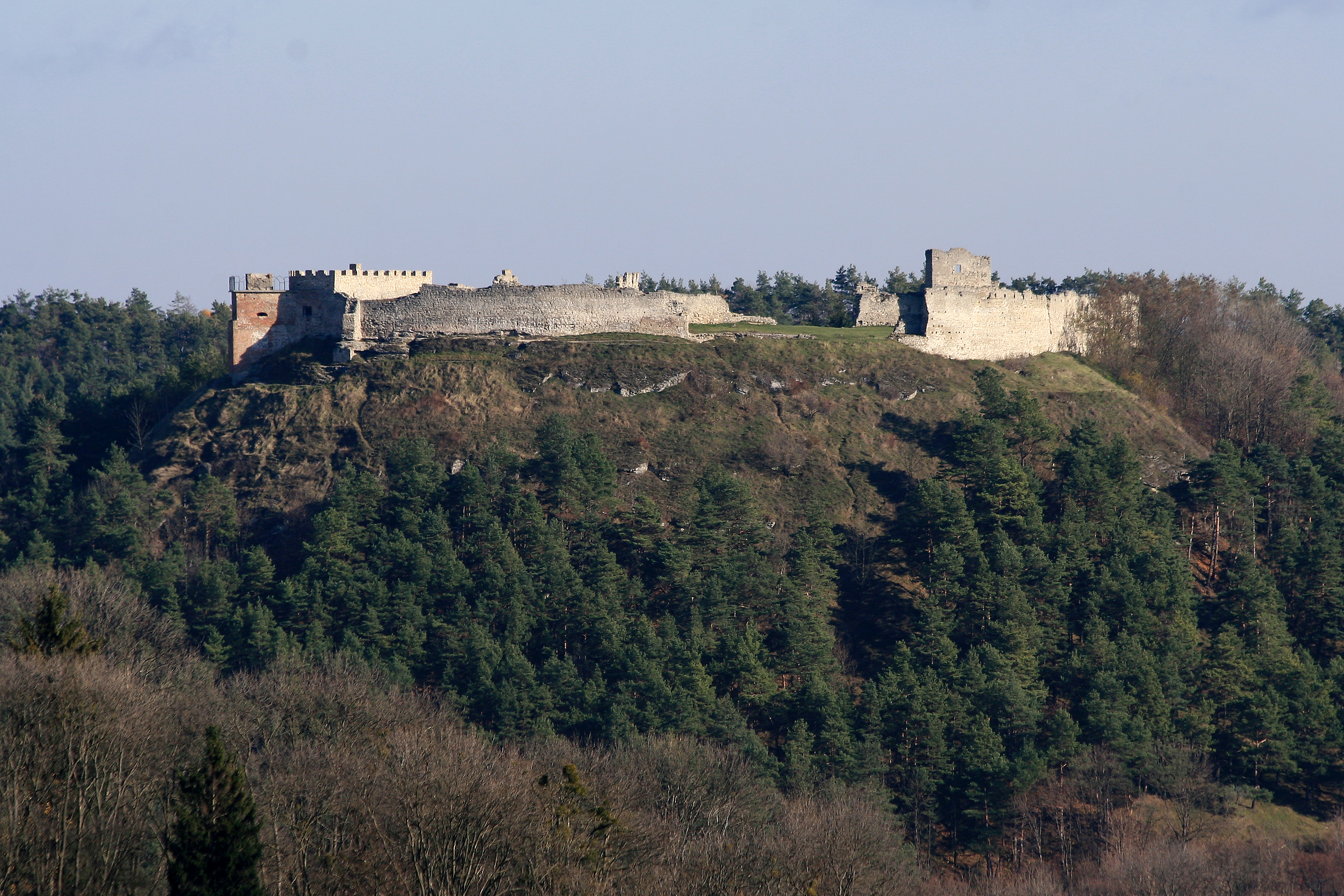
Remainings of the Royal Castle, Kremenets

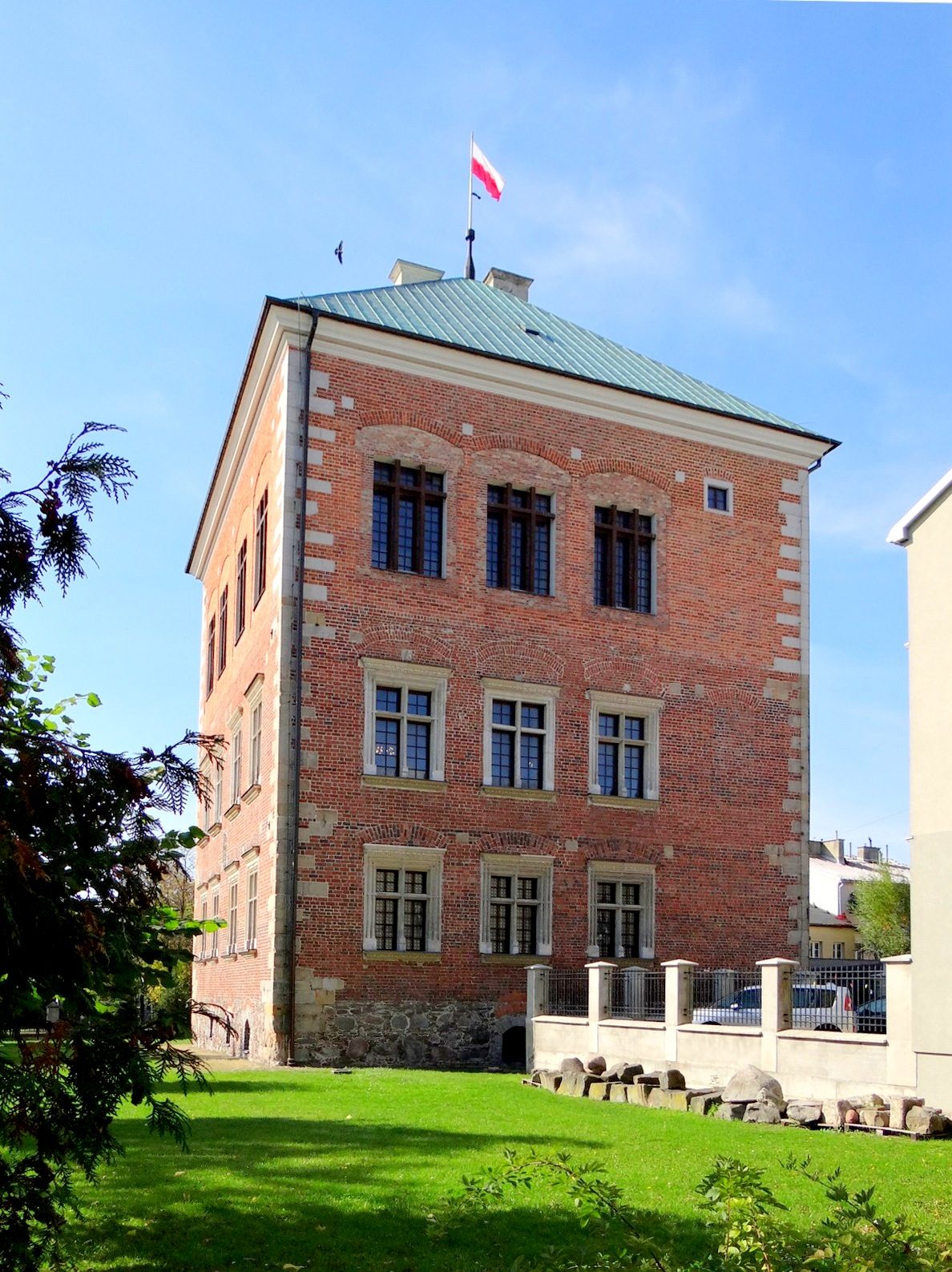
Royal Castle, Piotrków Trybunalski

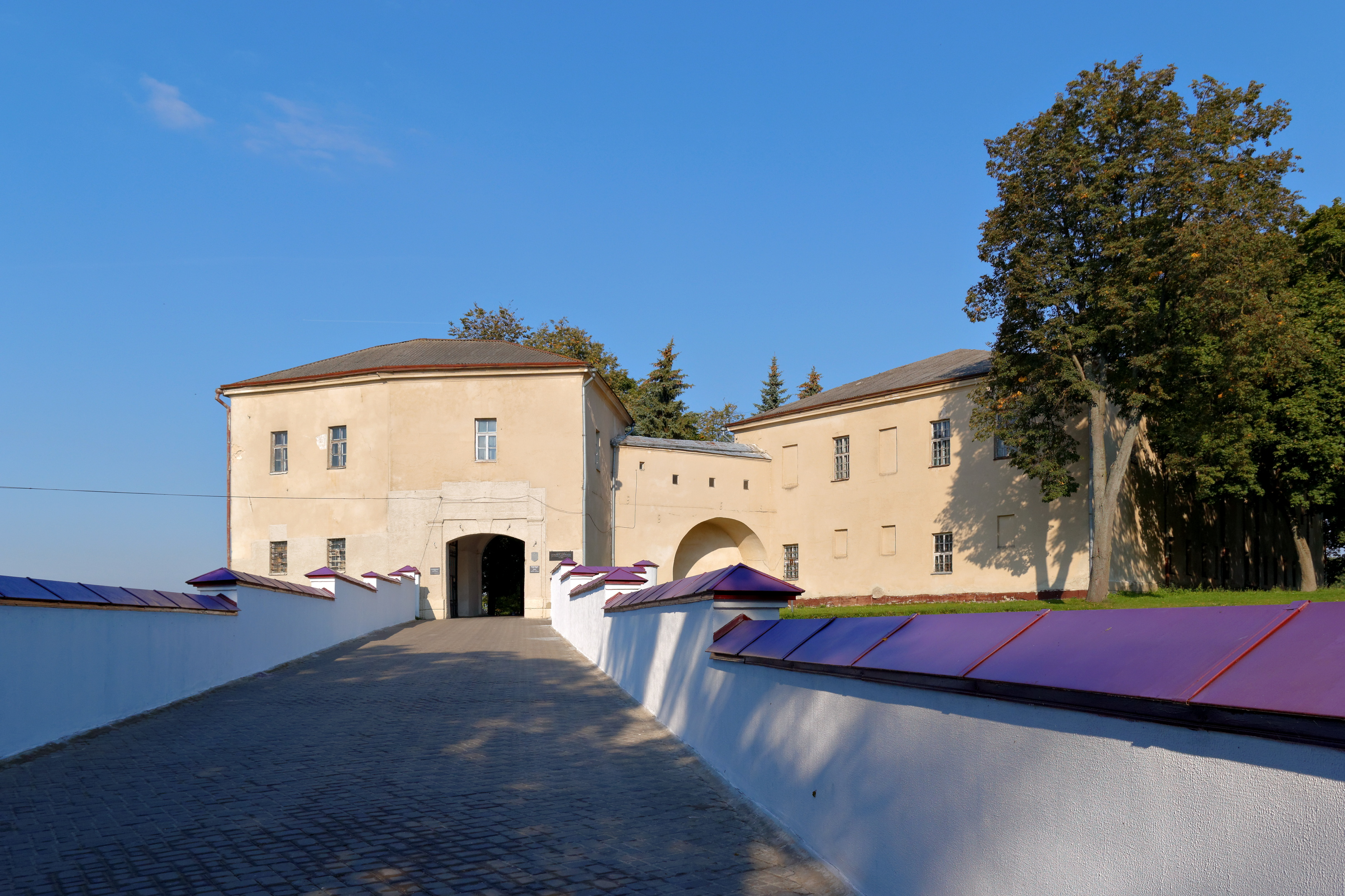
Old Grodno Castle

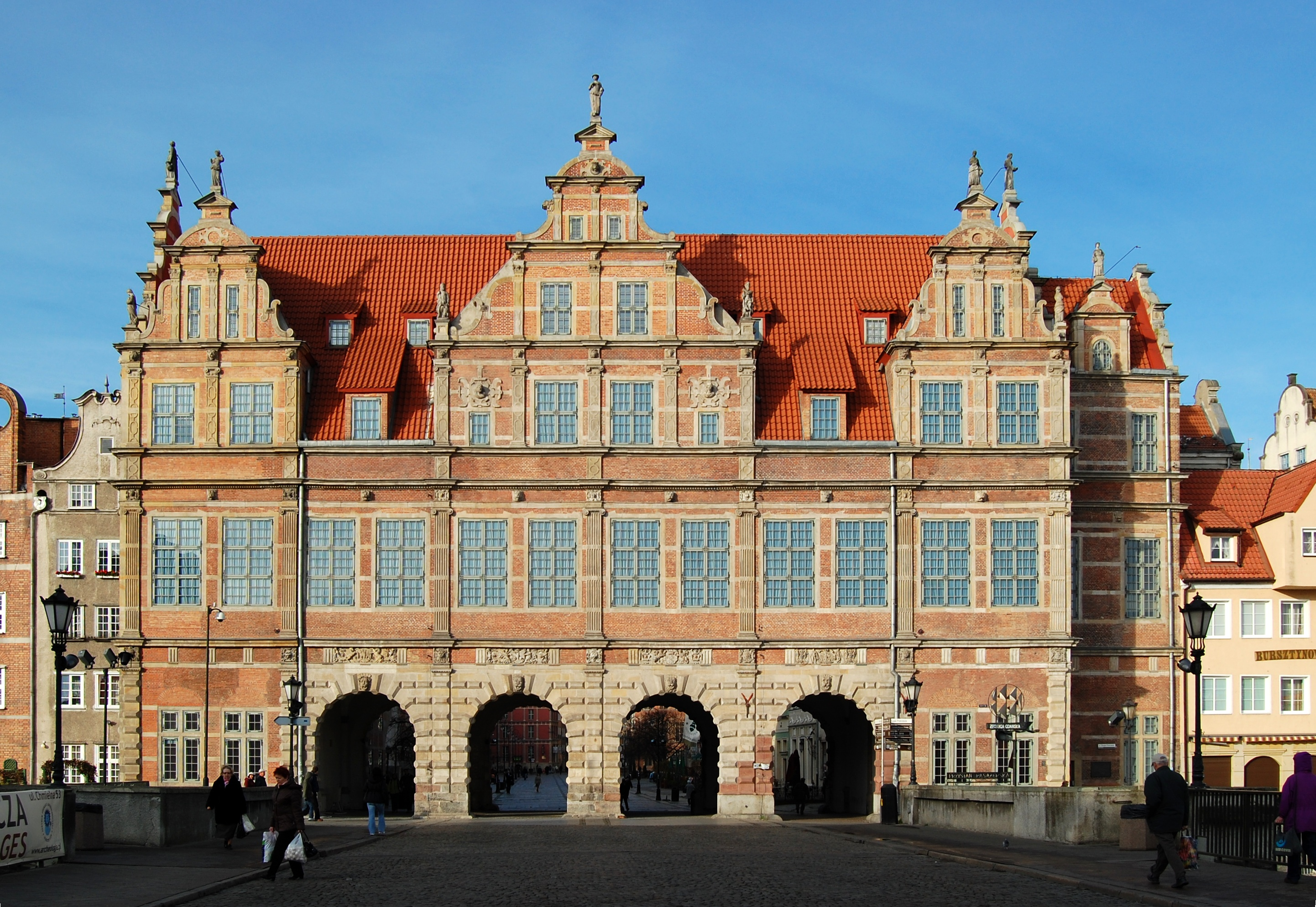
Green Gate, Gdańsk

== Old towns ==
The historic old towns of Kraków, Warsaw, Toruń, Vilnius and Lviv are designated UNESCO World Heritage Sites. Additionally the old towns of Gdańsk, Kazimierz Dolny, Lublin, Przemyśl, Sandomierz and Tykocin are designated Historic Monuments of Poland. and those Kaunas and Trakai – as Monuments of Culture of Lithuania.

Gallery of Commonwealth royal cities historic centers include:

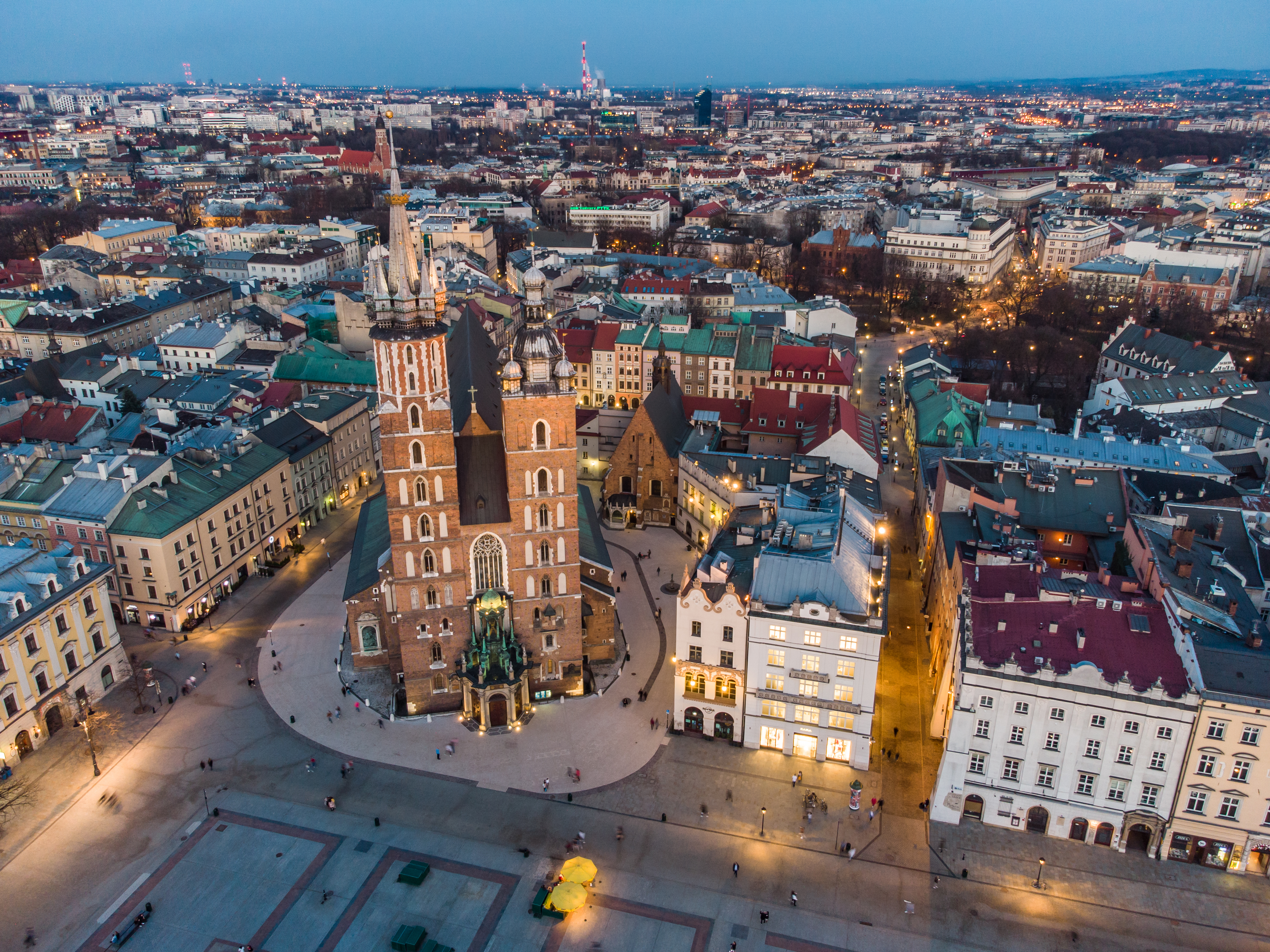
Kraków Old Town (World Heritage Site)

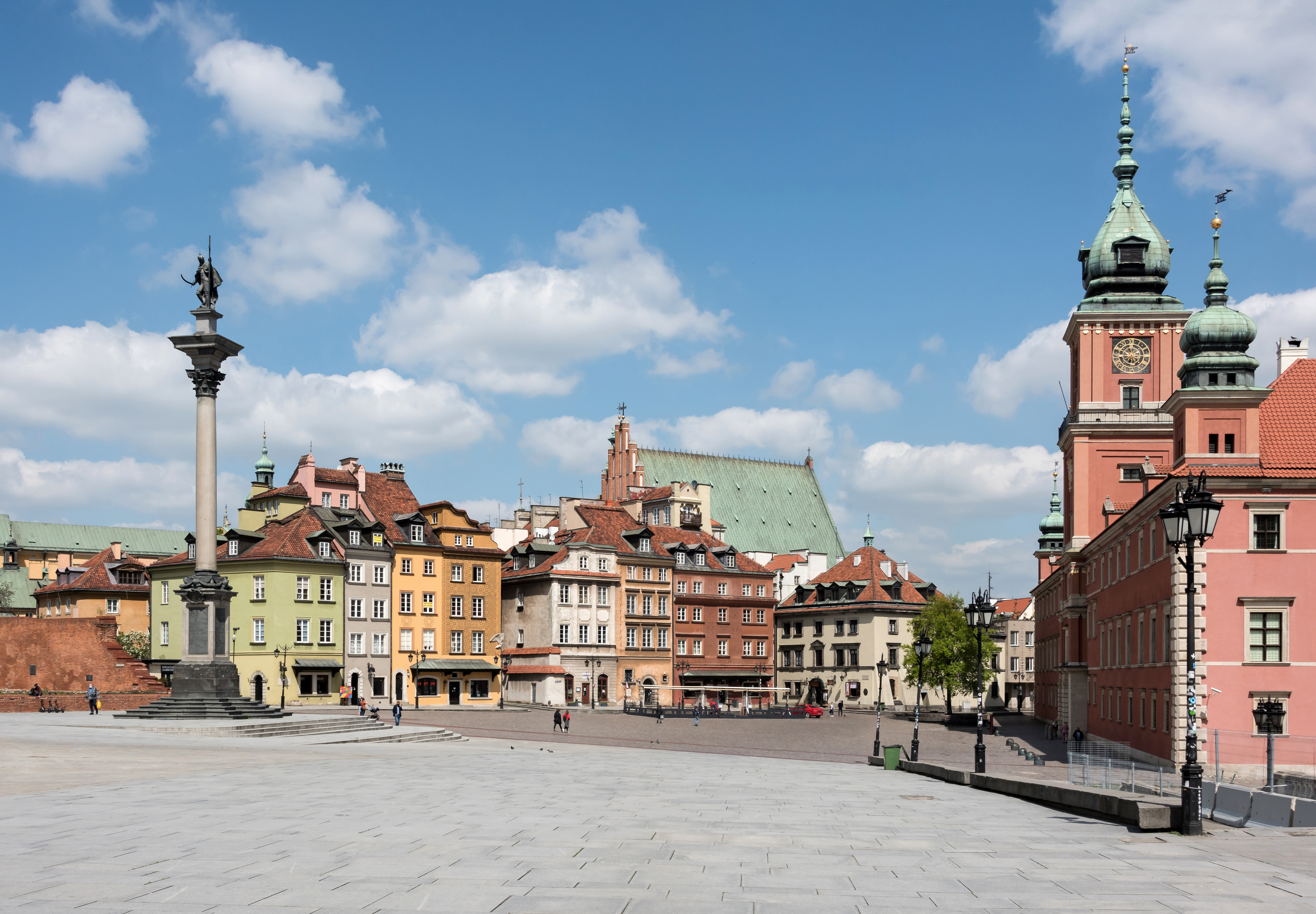
Warsaw Old Town (World Heritage Site)

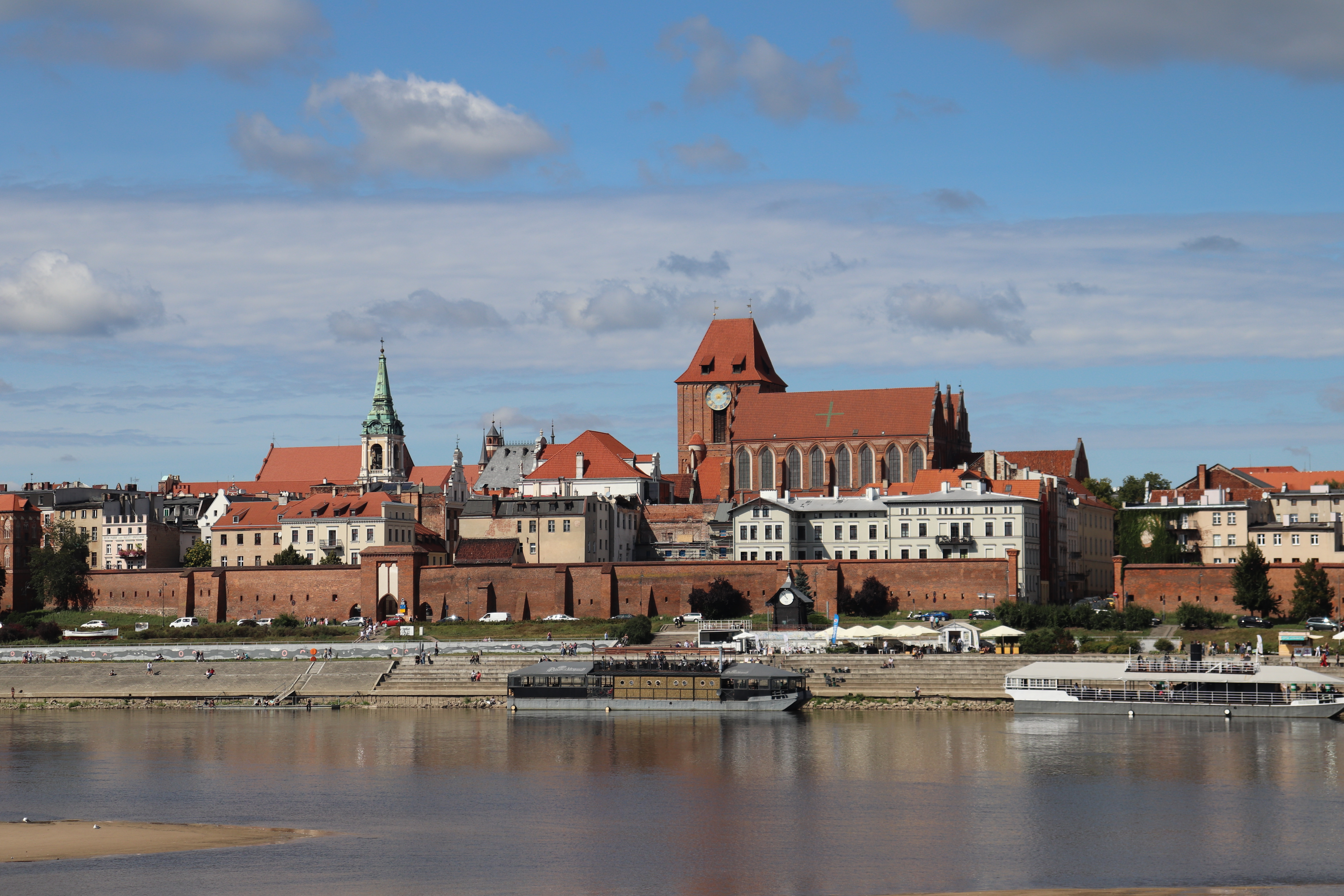
Medieval Town of Toruń (World Heritage Site)

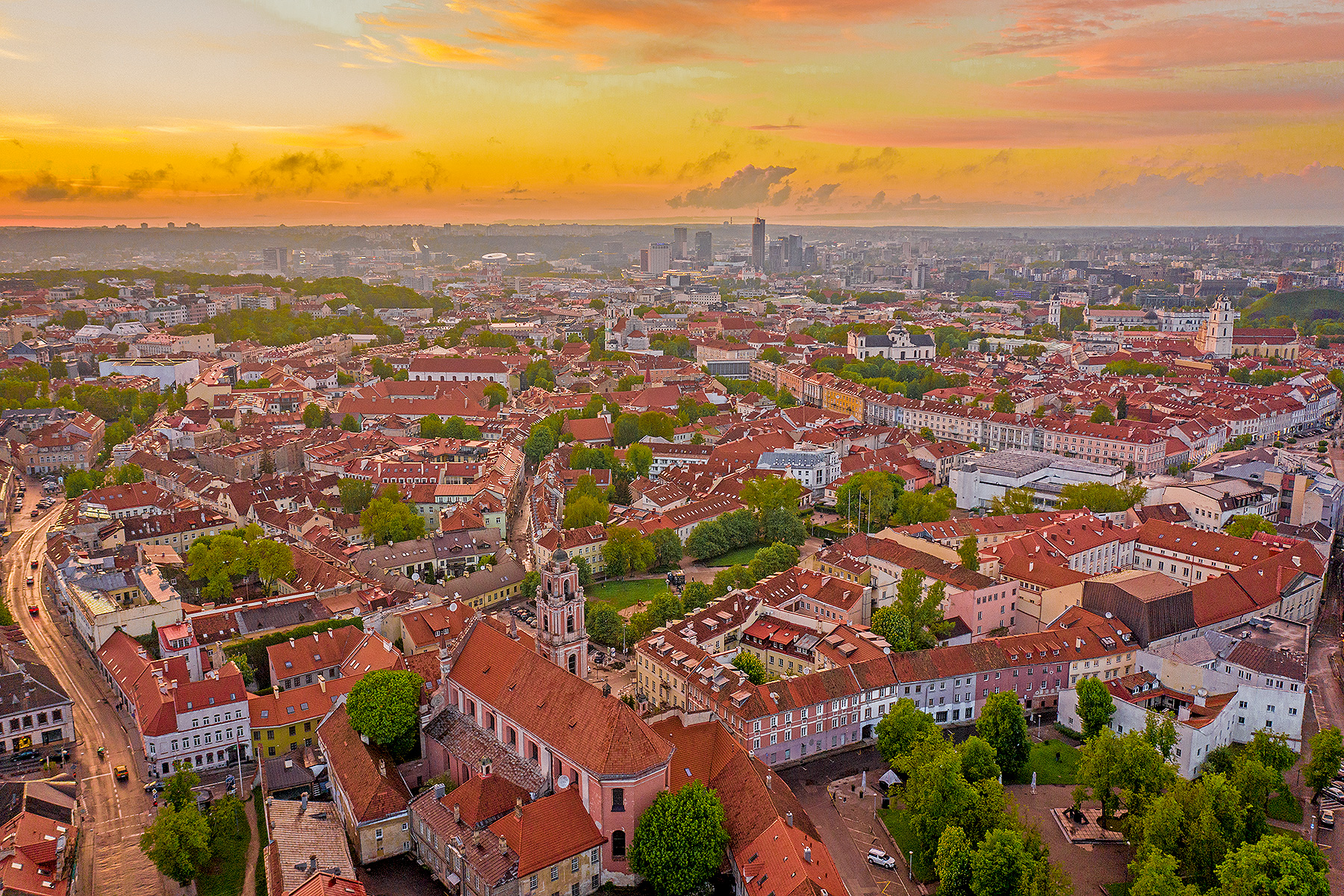
Vilnius Old Town (World Heritage Site)

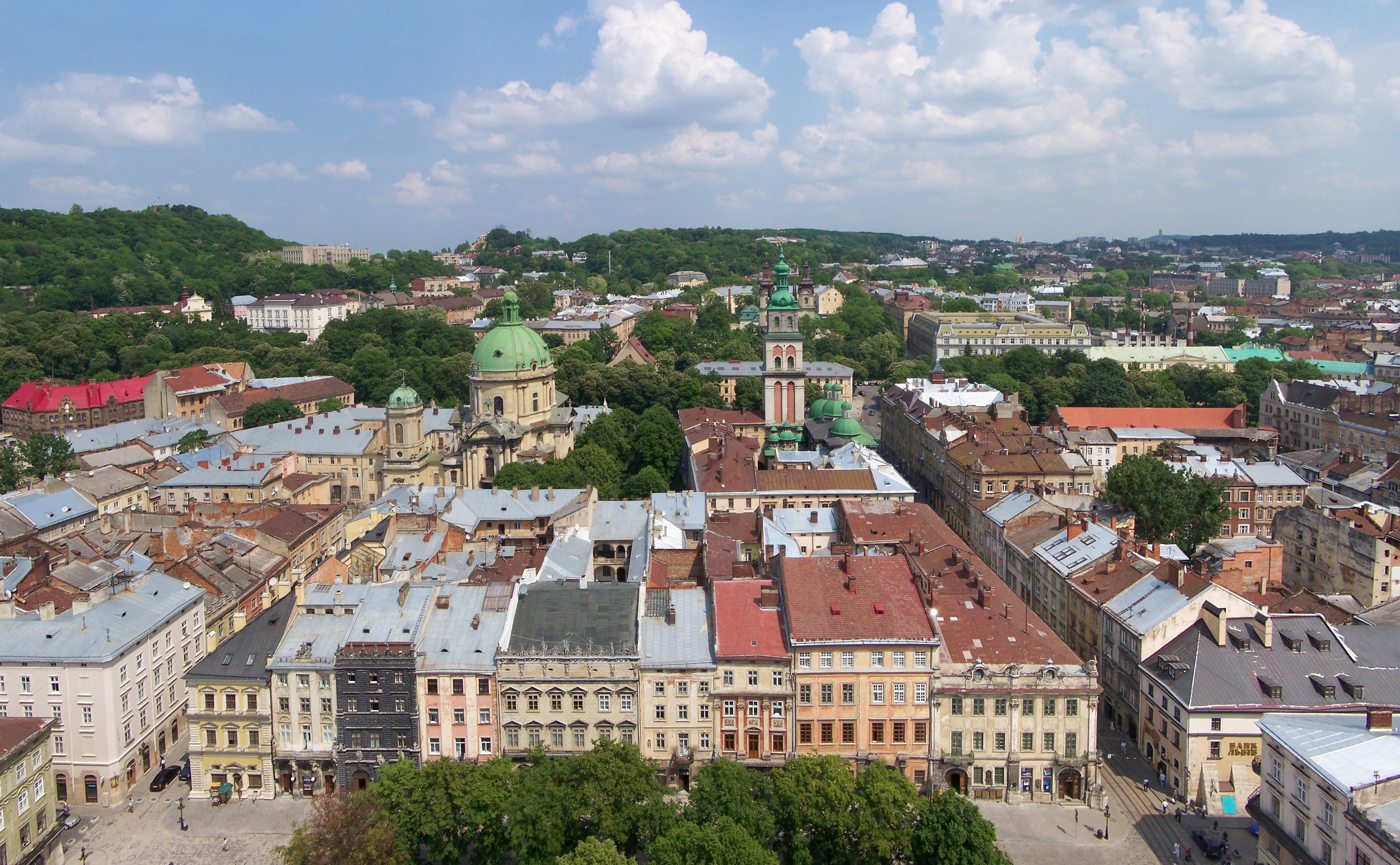
Lviv Old Town (World Heritage Site)

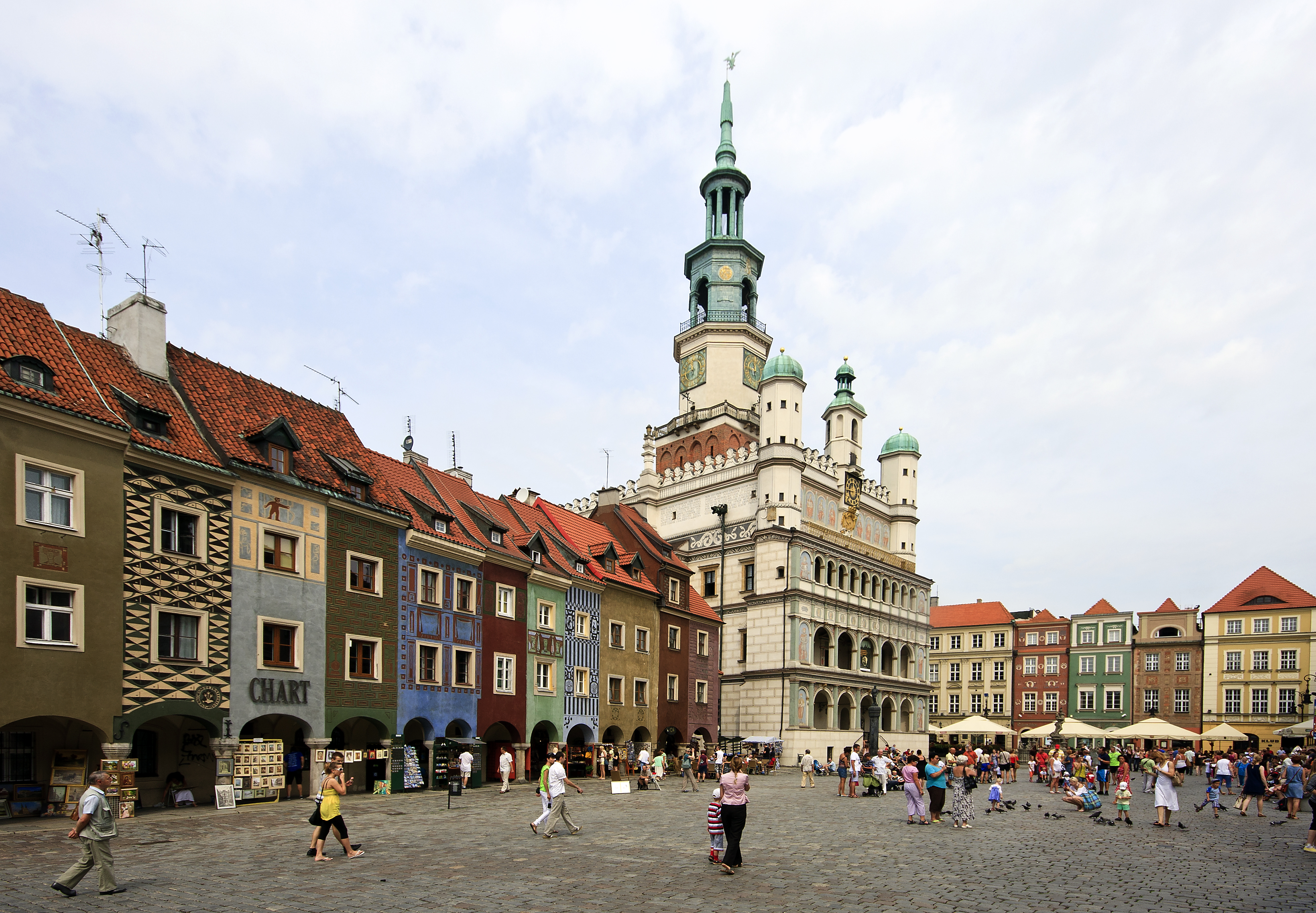
Poznań Old Town

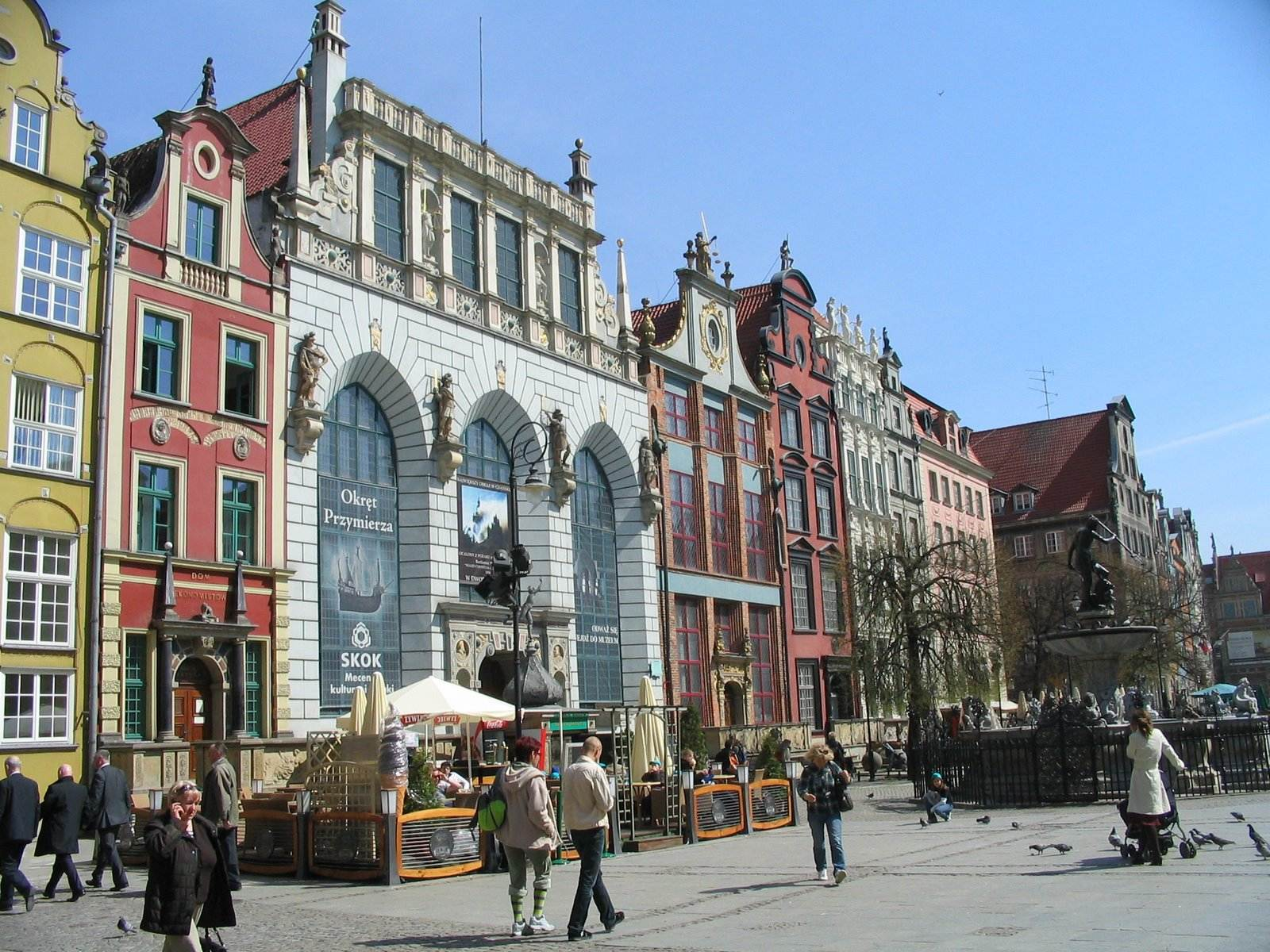
Gdańsk Main City

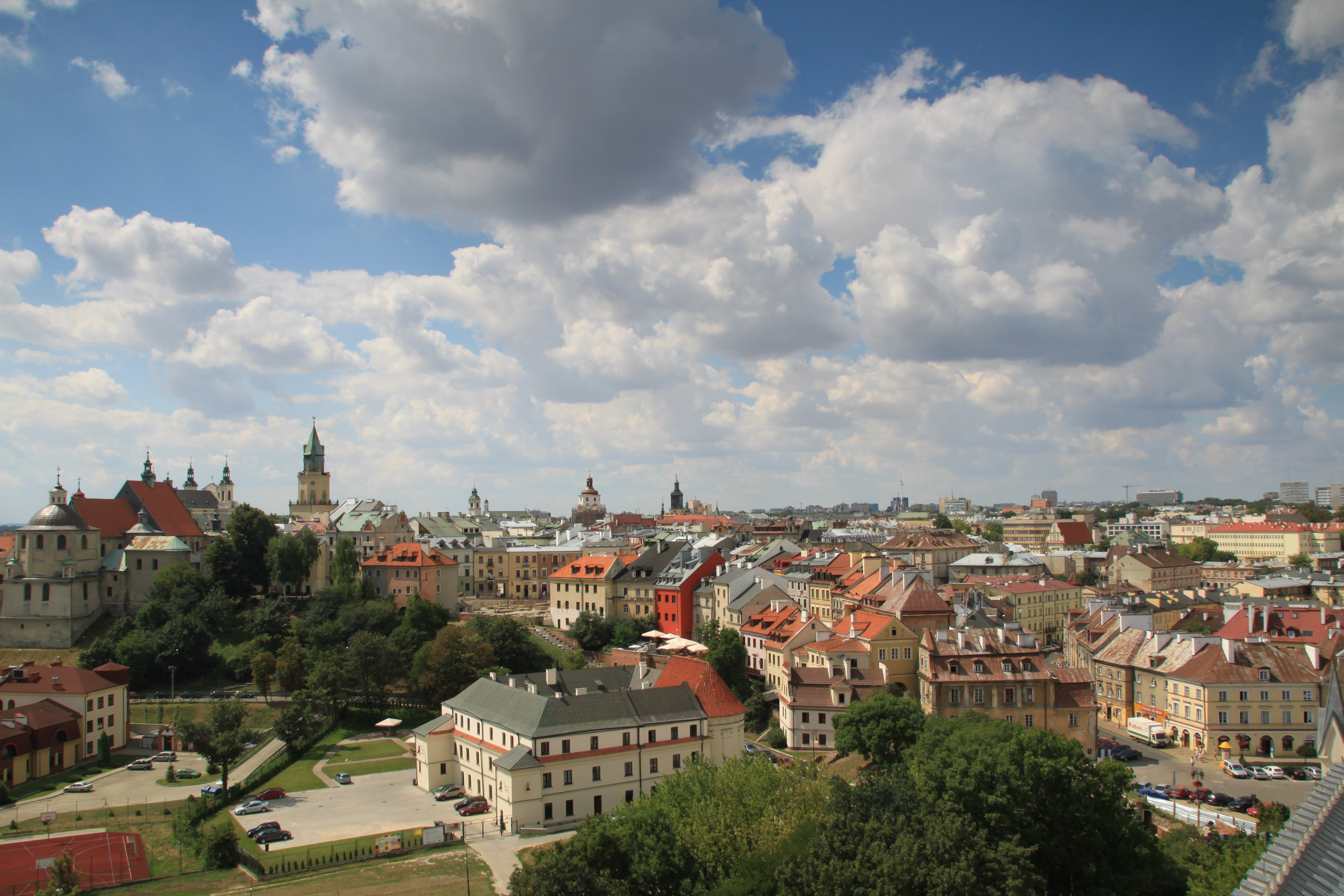
Lublin Old Town

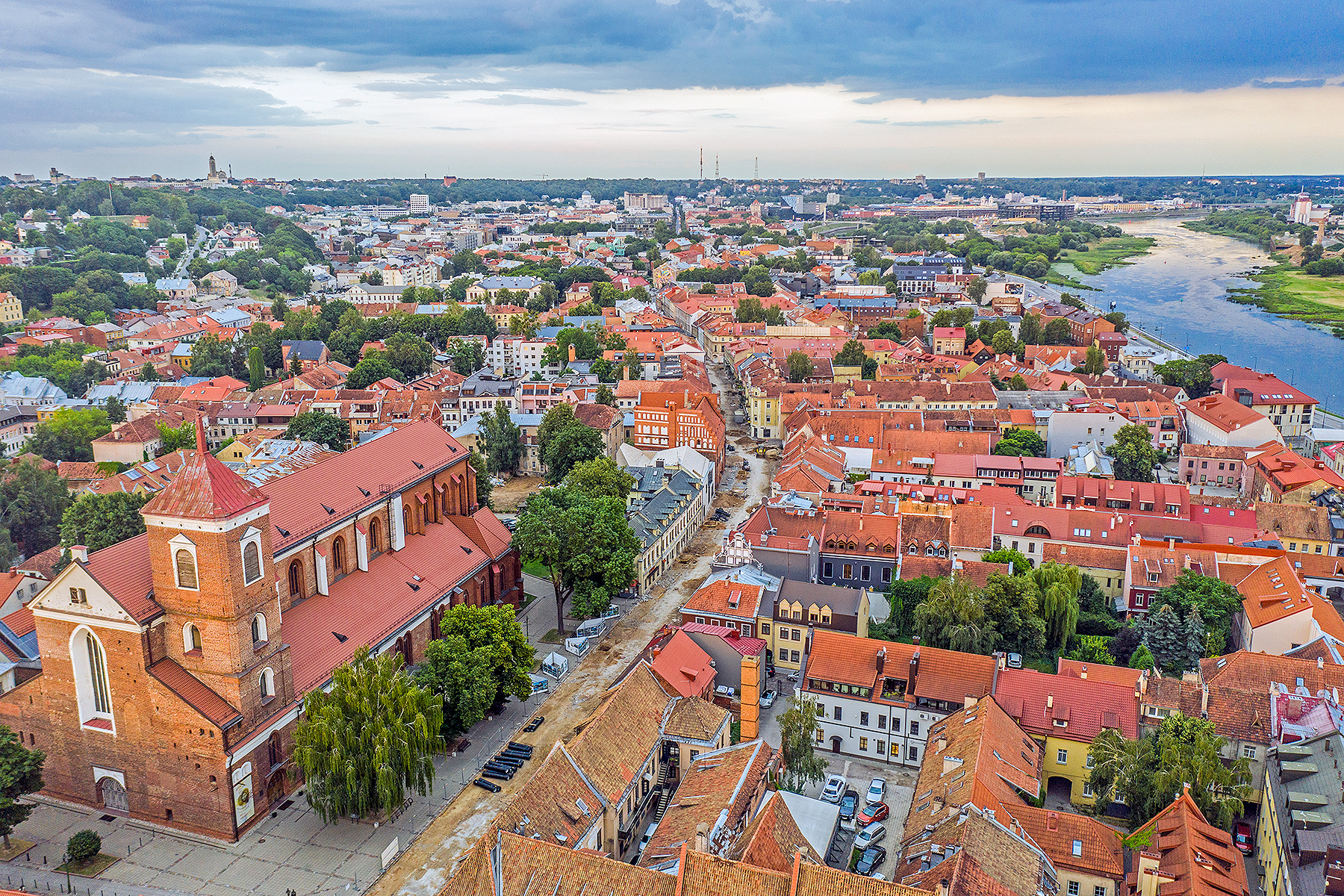
Kaunas Old Town

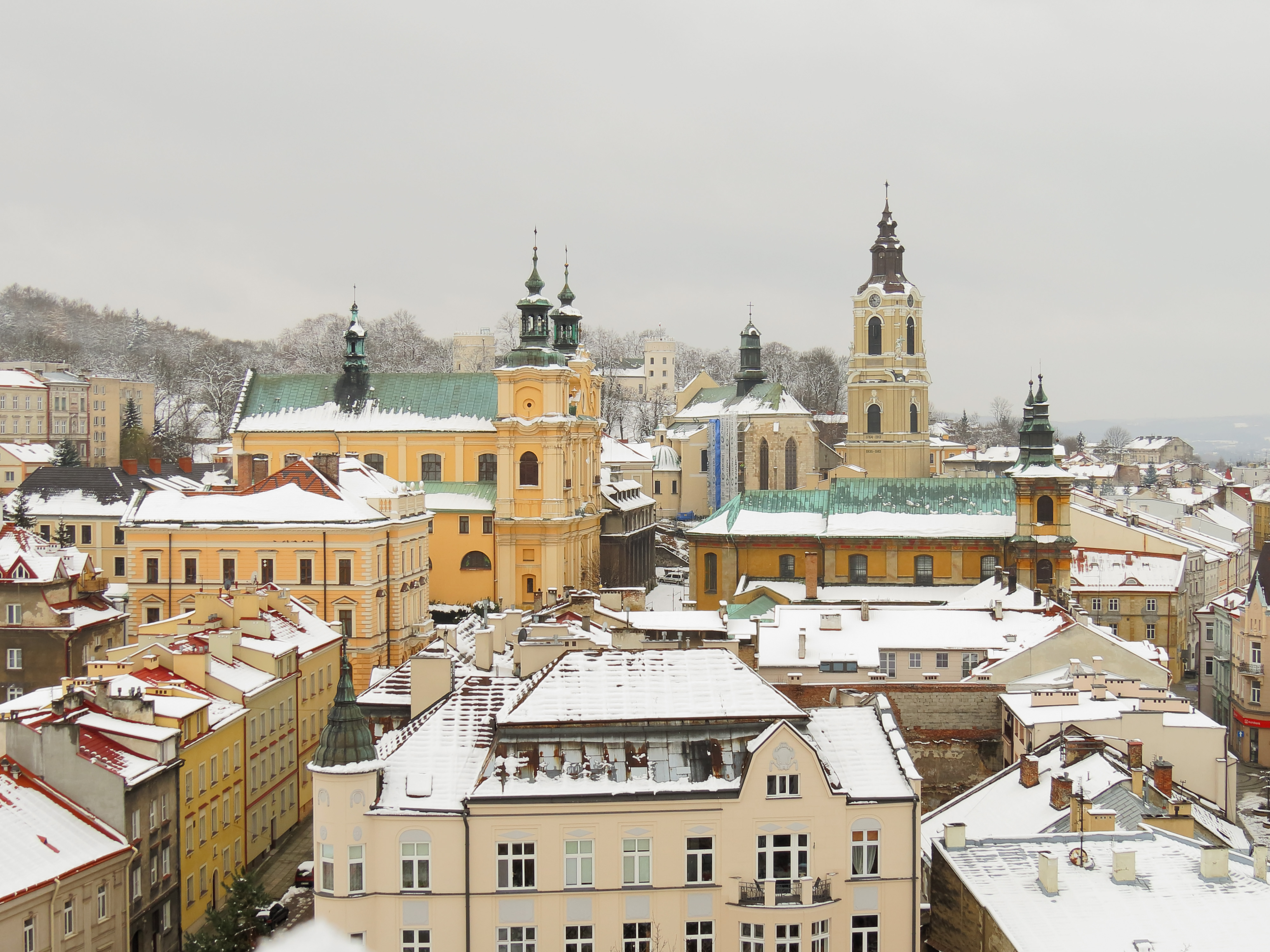
Przemyśl Old Town

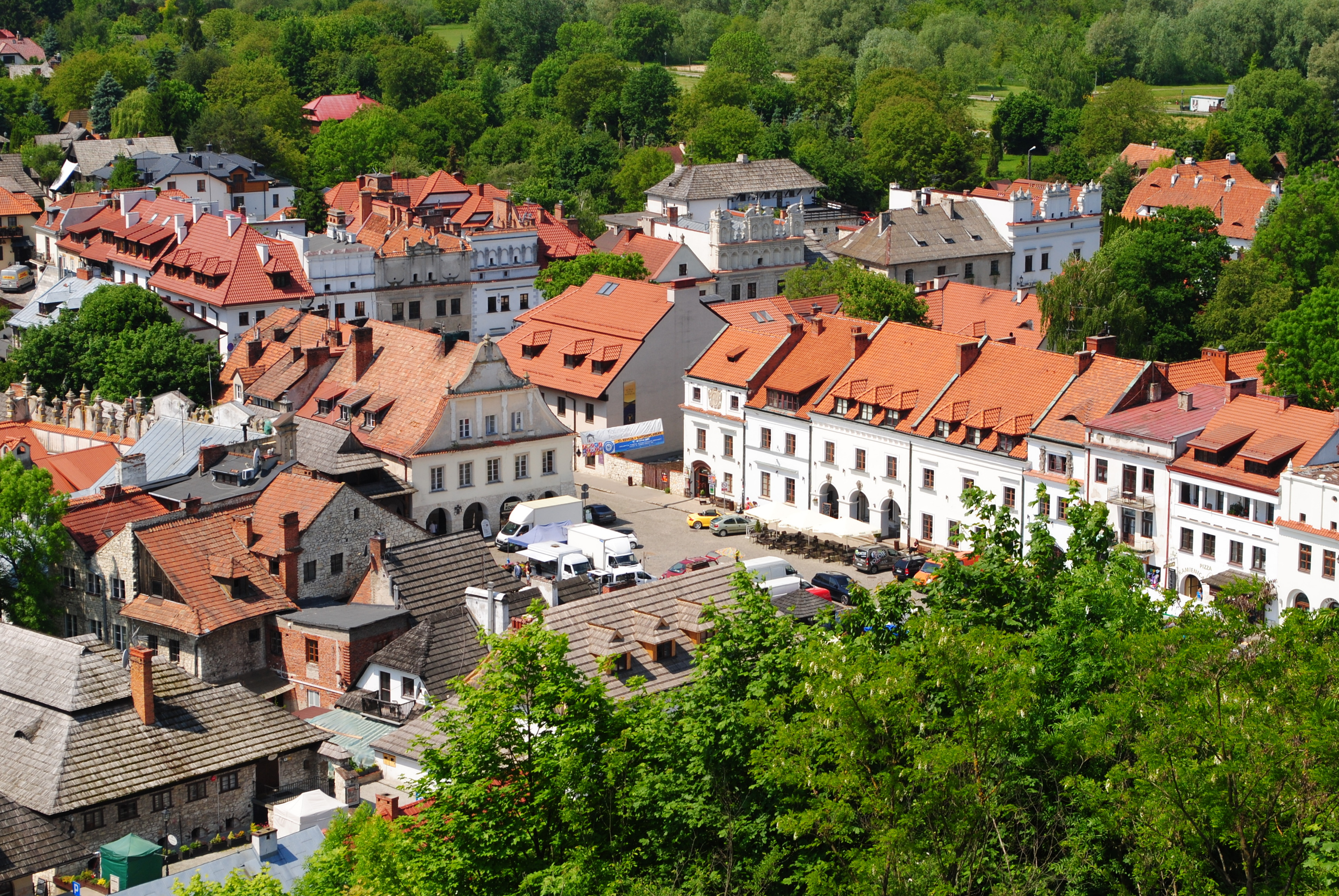
Kazimierz Dolny Old Town

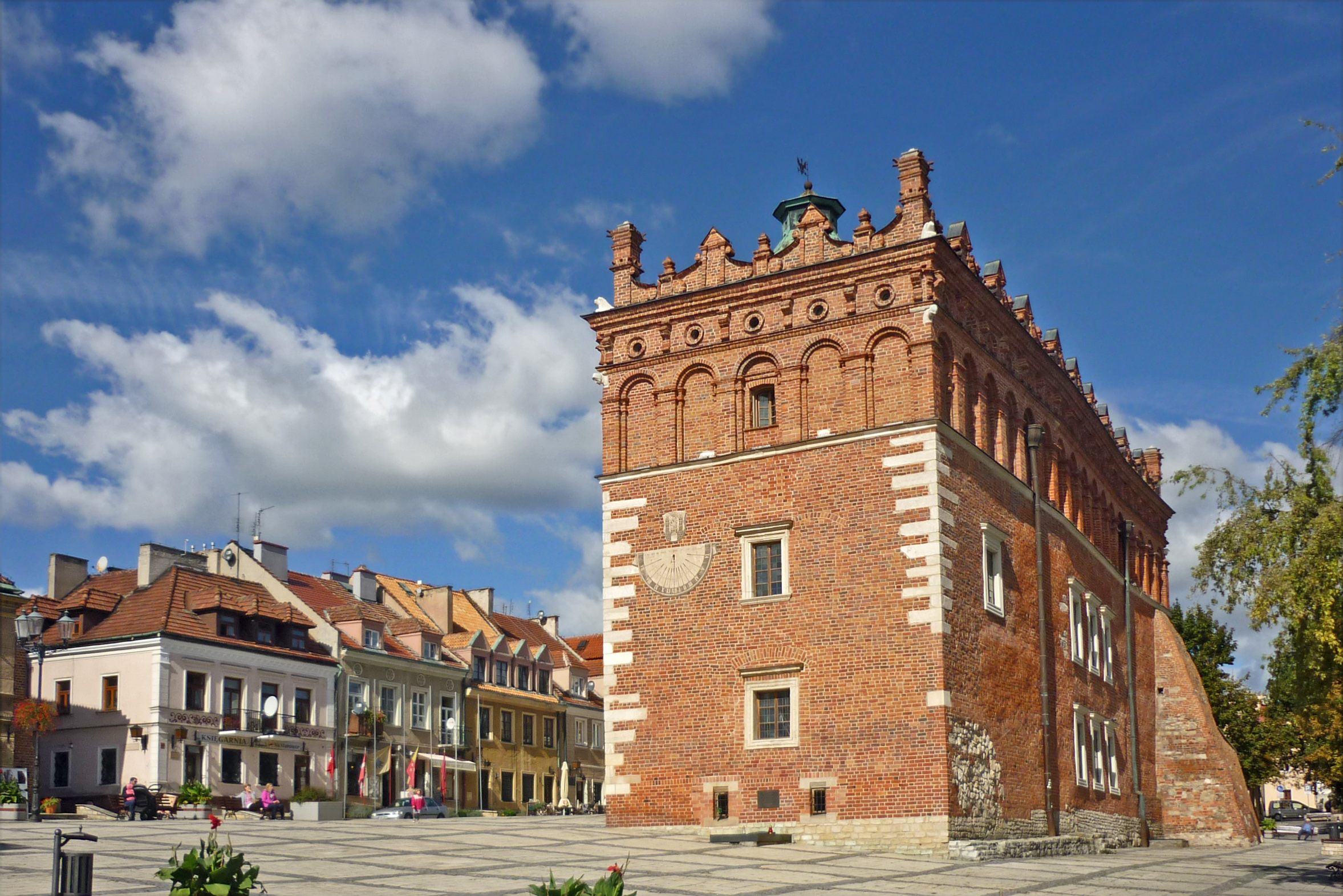
Sandomierz Old Town

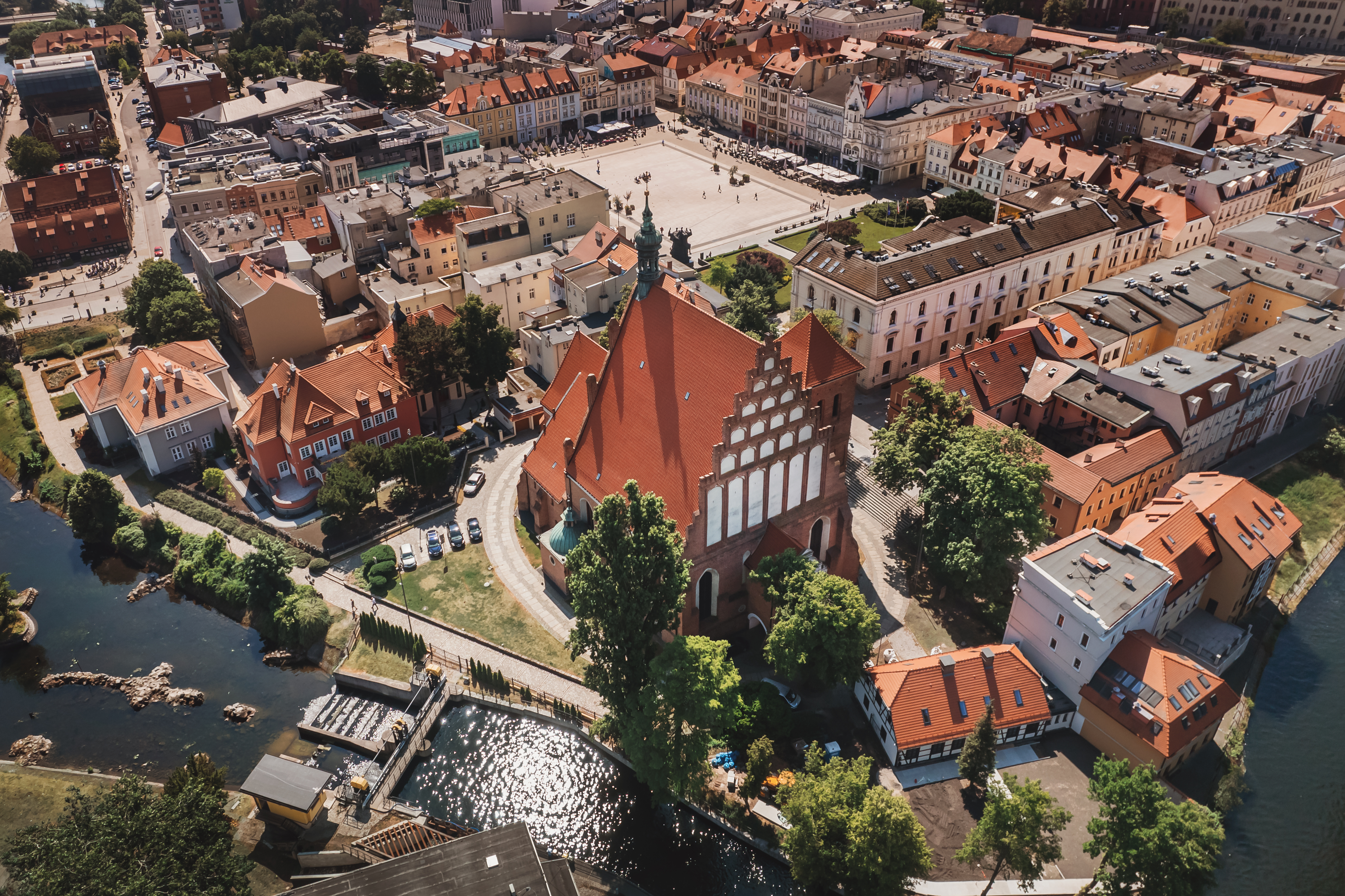
Bydgoszcz Old Town

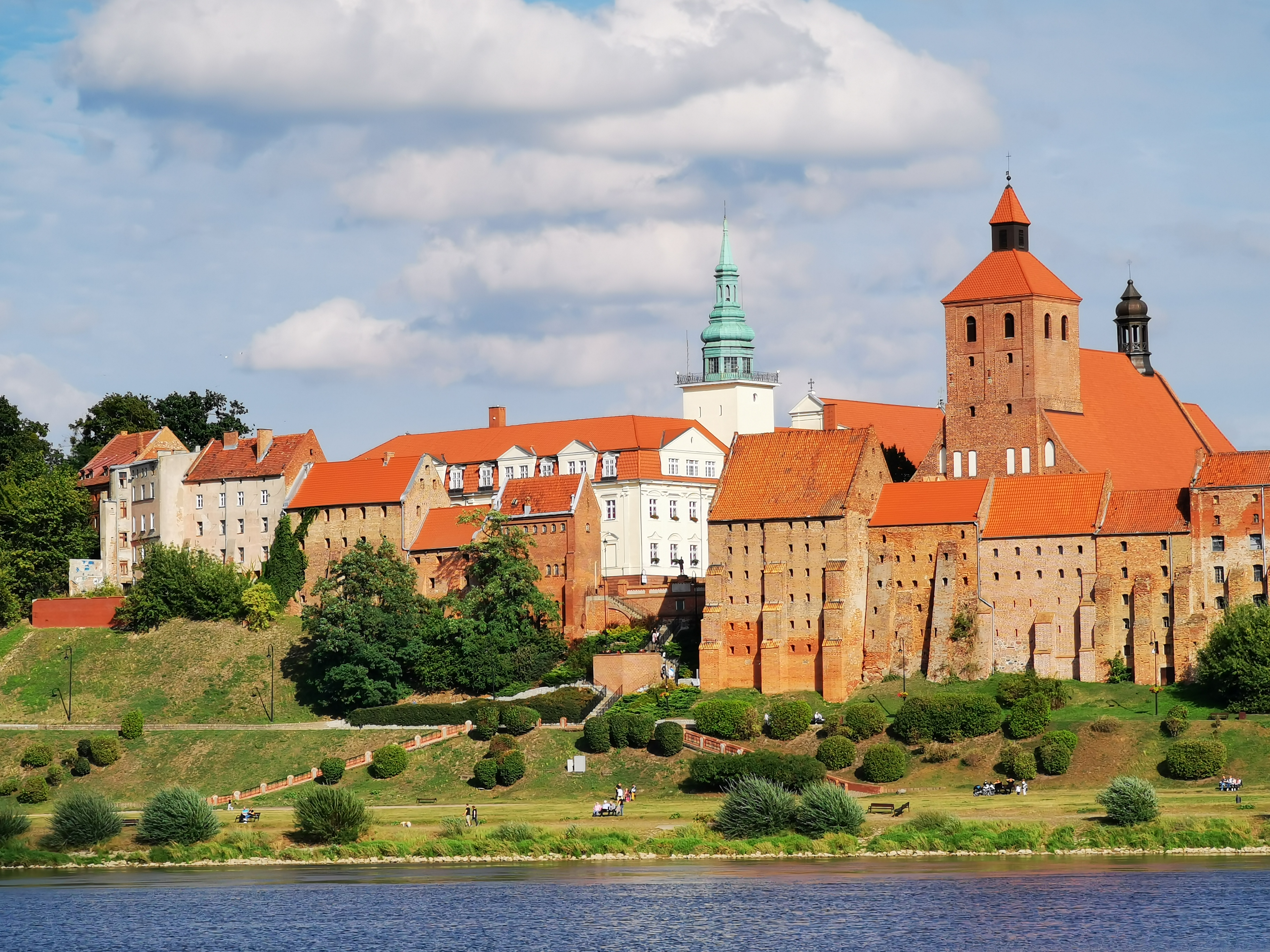
Grudziądz Old Town

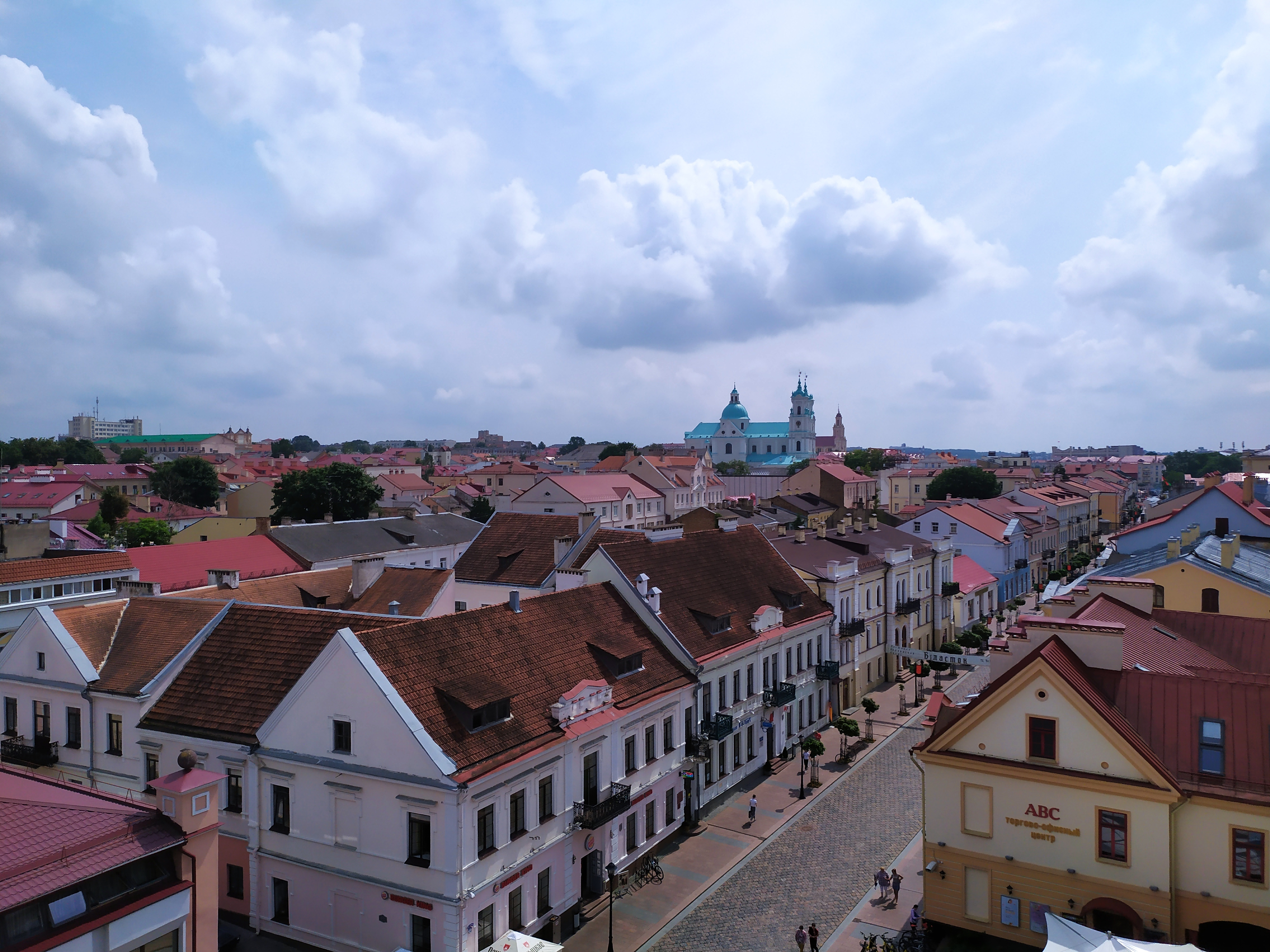
Grodno Old Town

== See also ==
- Royal burgh
- Royal town (disambiguation)
- Royal free city, Hungary
