= Kulm law =

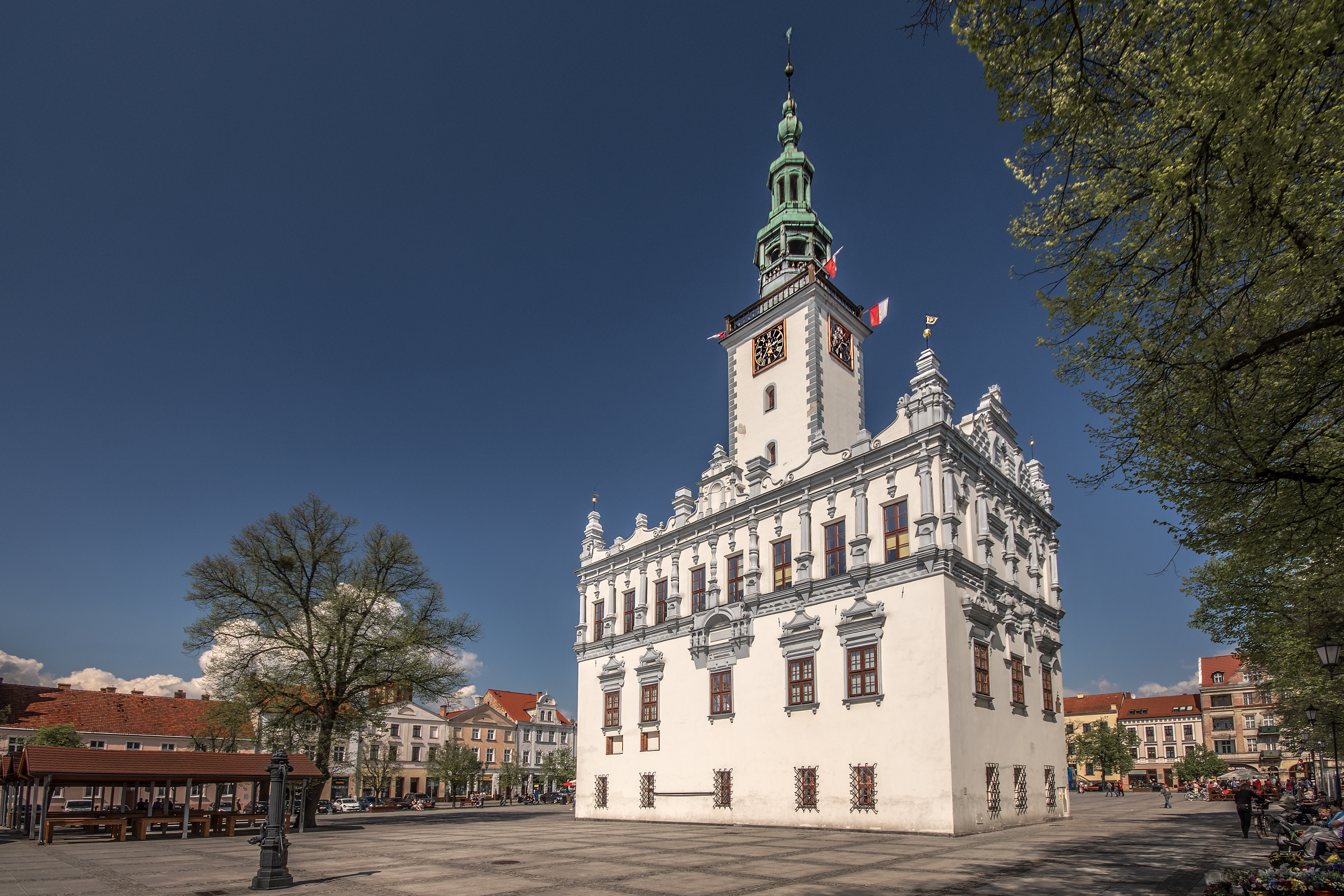
The legal constitution takes its name from Chełmno, the first town to obtain such law.

Kulm law, Culm law or Chełmno Law (German: Kulmer Recht; Latin: Jus Culmense vetus; Polish: Prawo chełmińskie) was a legal constitution for a municipal form of government used in several Central European cities in the Middle Ages and early modern period.

It was initiated on 28 December 1233 in the Monastic State of the Teutonic Knights by Grand Master Hermann von Salza and Hermann Balk when the towns of Toruń (Thorn) and Chełmno (Kulm) received German town law, in particular as a modification of Magdeburg rights. Named after the town it was signed in, the original document (Kulmer Handfeste) was lost in 1244 when the town hall burned due to an attack by Świętopełk II, Duke of Pomerania. The renewed charter of 1 October 1251 was based on a copy in Toruń, but the rights were reduced. The town hall in Chełmno was the seat of the higher court of Chełmno law until 1458.

This type of law was mostly granted by the Teutonic Order to cities within their monastic state, and by the neighboring Duchy of Masovia, but also elsewhere in Poland and Lithuania. The law introduced a number of advantages for residents over Magdeburg rights, including the right to elect the local judge, and the right of inheritance by descendants of both genders. From the 13th to the 18th century, at least 224 towns were vested with the law. In addition, the Kulm law was expanded, independently from the Knights, to a larger set of laws called Alter Kulm.

During World War II the charter of 1251 was stolen by the German occupiers from the Old Town City Hall in Toruń, but was restored to Poland after the war. It is held in the State Archive in Toruń since 1959. It is listed on the Polish National List of the Memory of the World Register, which includes candidates for the international register.

== Cities and towns ==
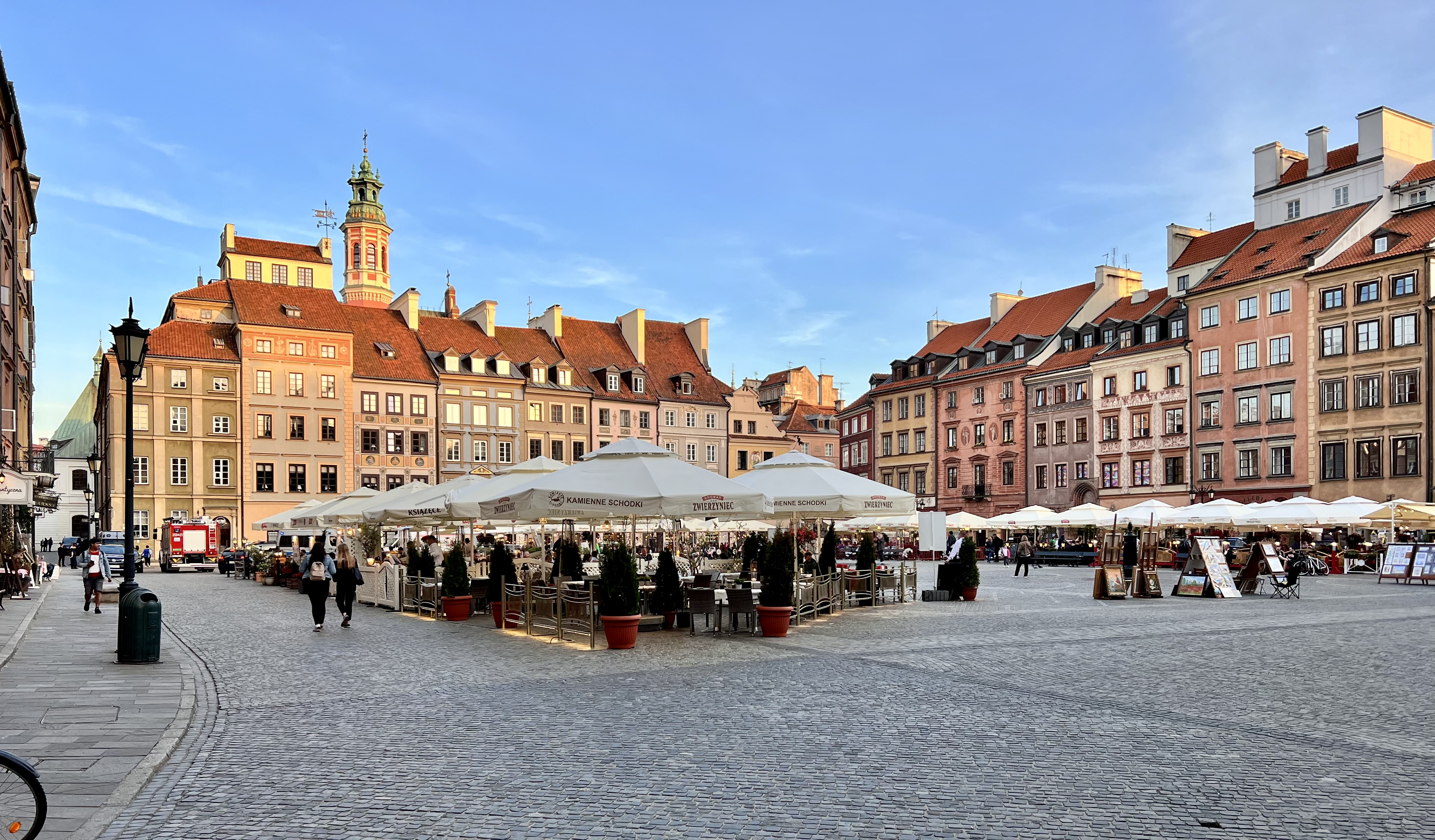
Warsaw, largest city which possessed Chełmno Law, whose Old Town is a UNESCO World Heritage Site and Historic Monument of Poland

Cities located under Chełmno Law are currently mostly located in northern and central Poland, in the regions of Dobrzyń Land, Krajna, Kuyavia, Masuria, Mazovia, Podlachia, Pomerania, Powiśle, Warmia, with some in southern Poland (Lesser Poland), and in Lithuania and Russia (Kaliningrad Oblast). The largest are Polish capital Warsaw, major cities on the Vistula River Płock, Toruń and Grudziądz, major port cities of Gdańsk, Kaliningrad and Klaipėda, plus Olsztyn.

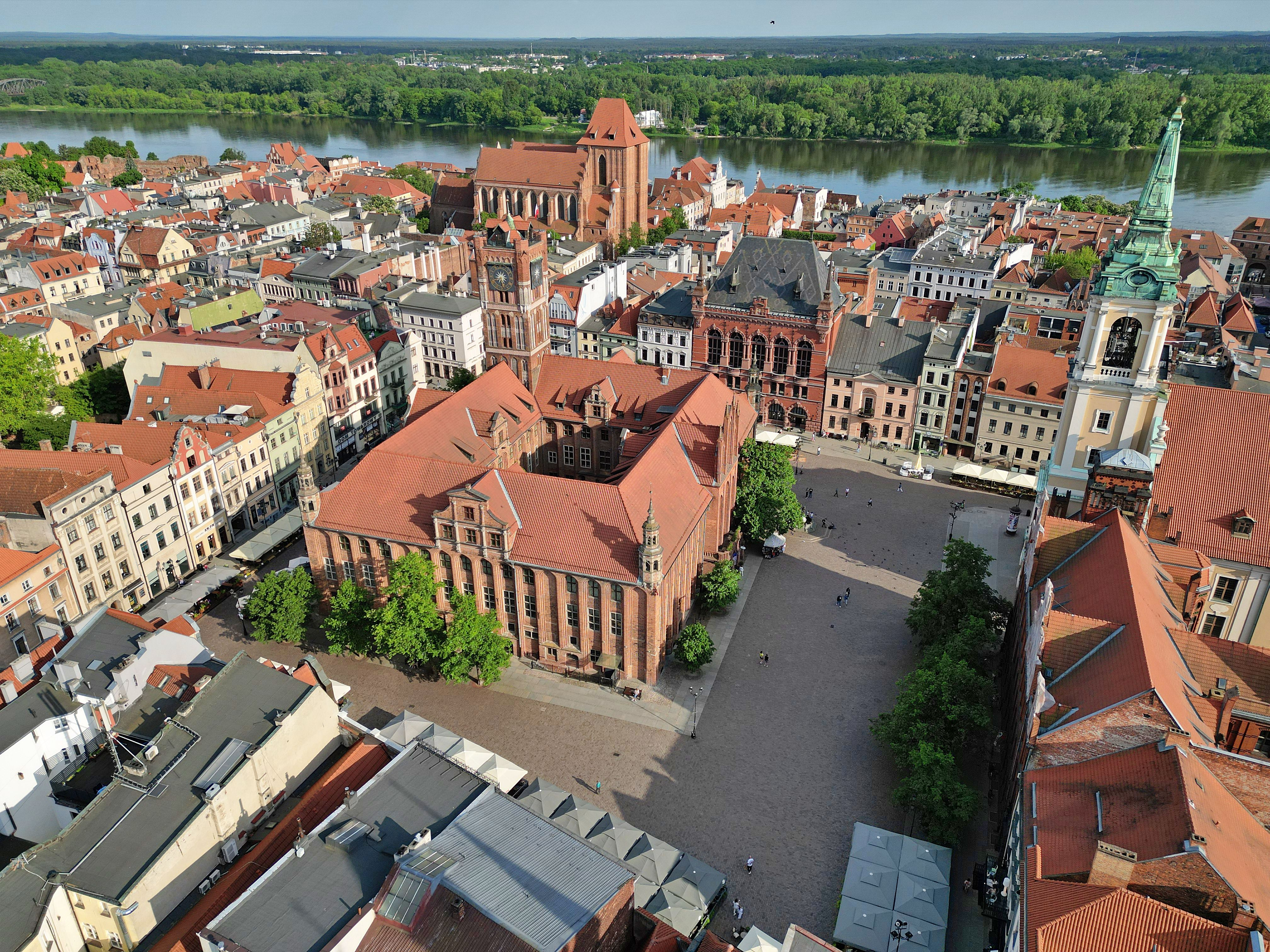
Old Town of Toruń, UNESCO World Heritage Site and Historic Monument of Poland

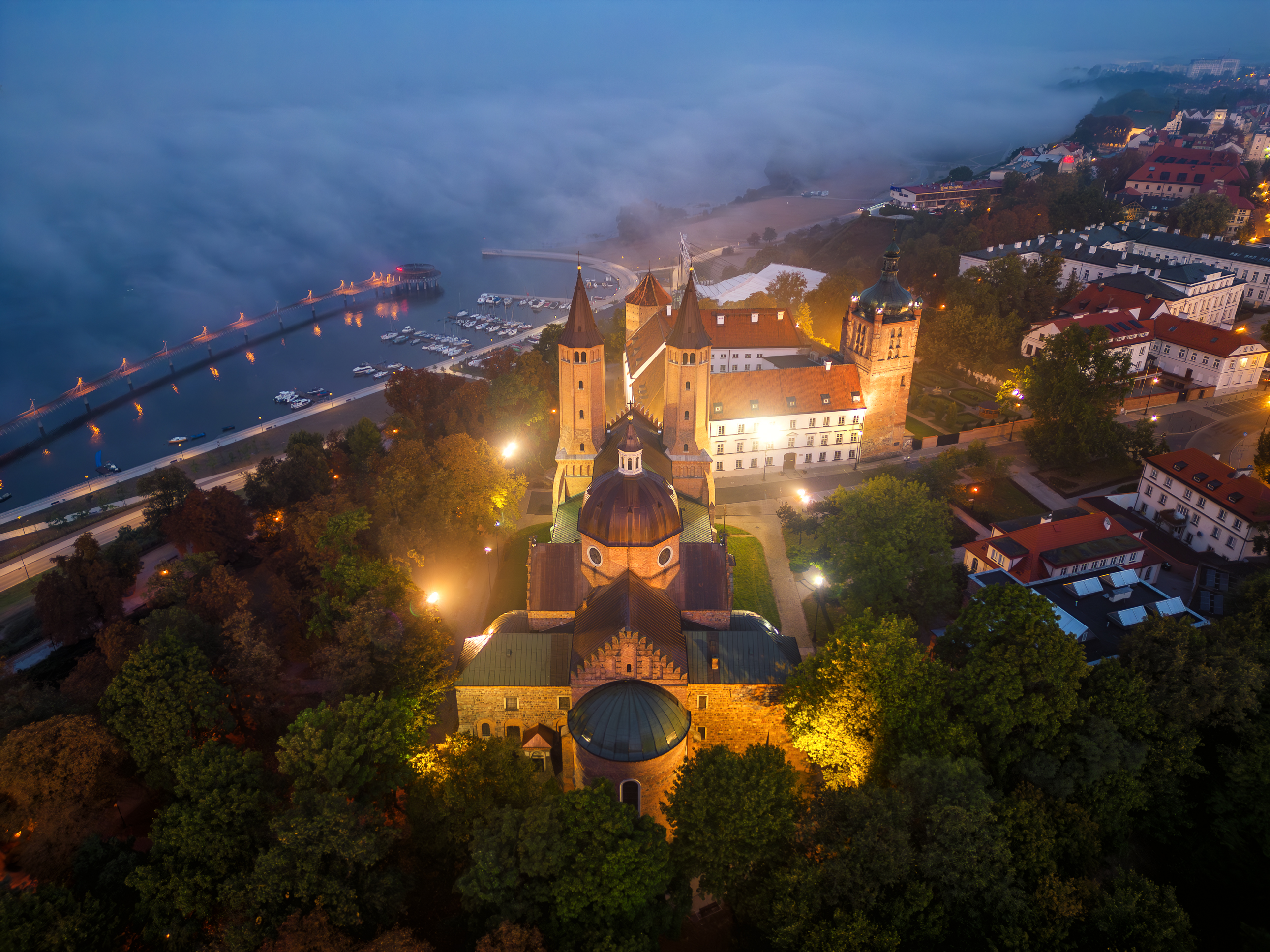
Cathedral Hill in Płock with the castle and cathedral containing a number of sarcophagi of Polish monarchs, Historic Monument of Poland

The historic centers of Toruń and Warsaw are listed as UNESCO World Heritage Sites, with the historic centers of Chełmno, Gdańsk and Tykocin, and major landmarks of Czerwińsk nad Wisłą, Grudziądz, Kwidzyn, Lidzbark Warmiński, Malbork, Olsztyn, Płock and Pułtusk additionally listed as Historic Monuments of Poland.

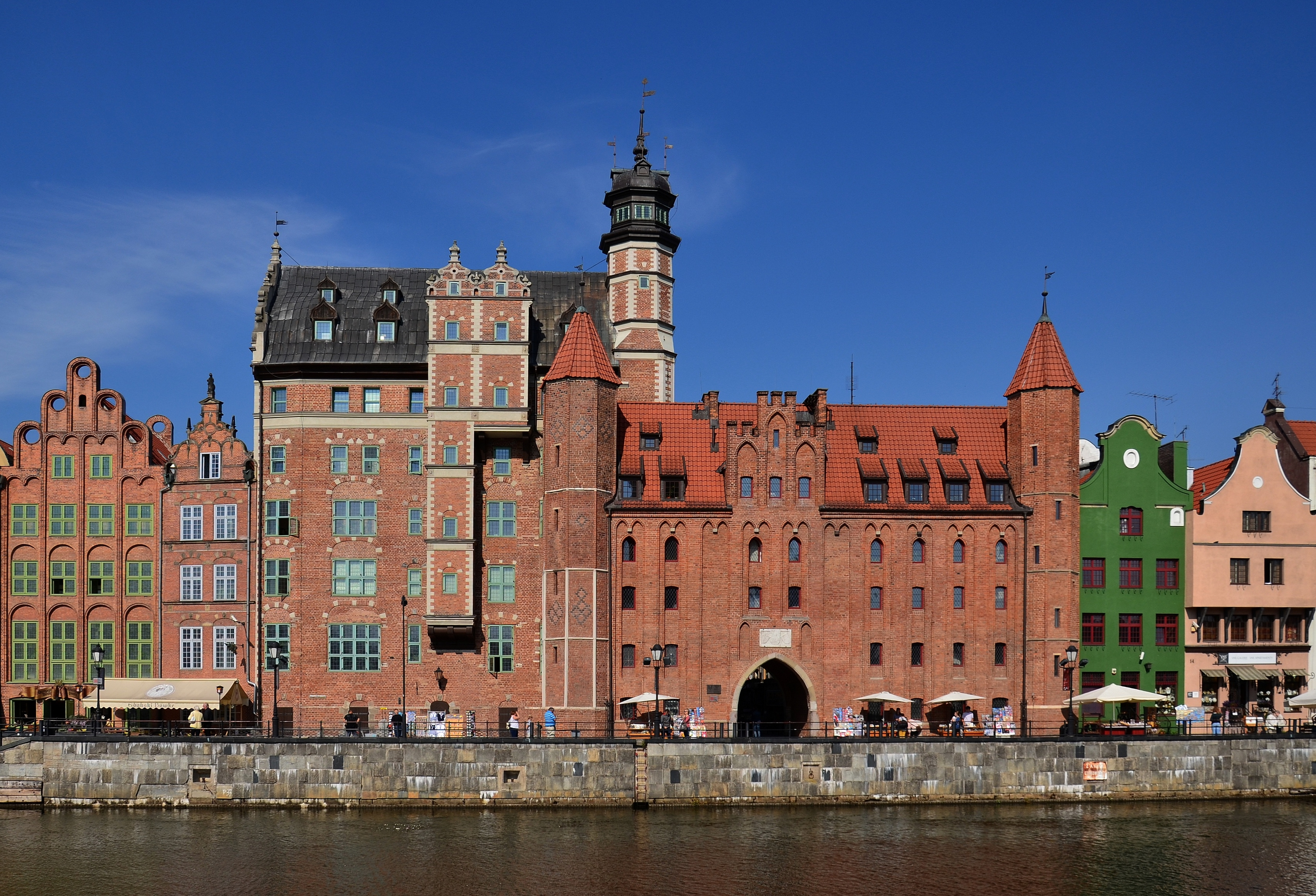
Old Town of Gdańsk, Historic Monument of Poland

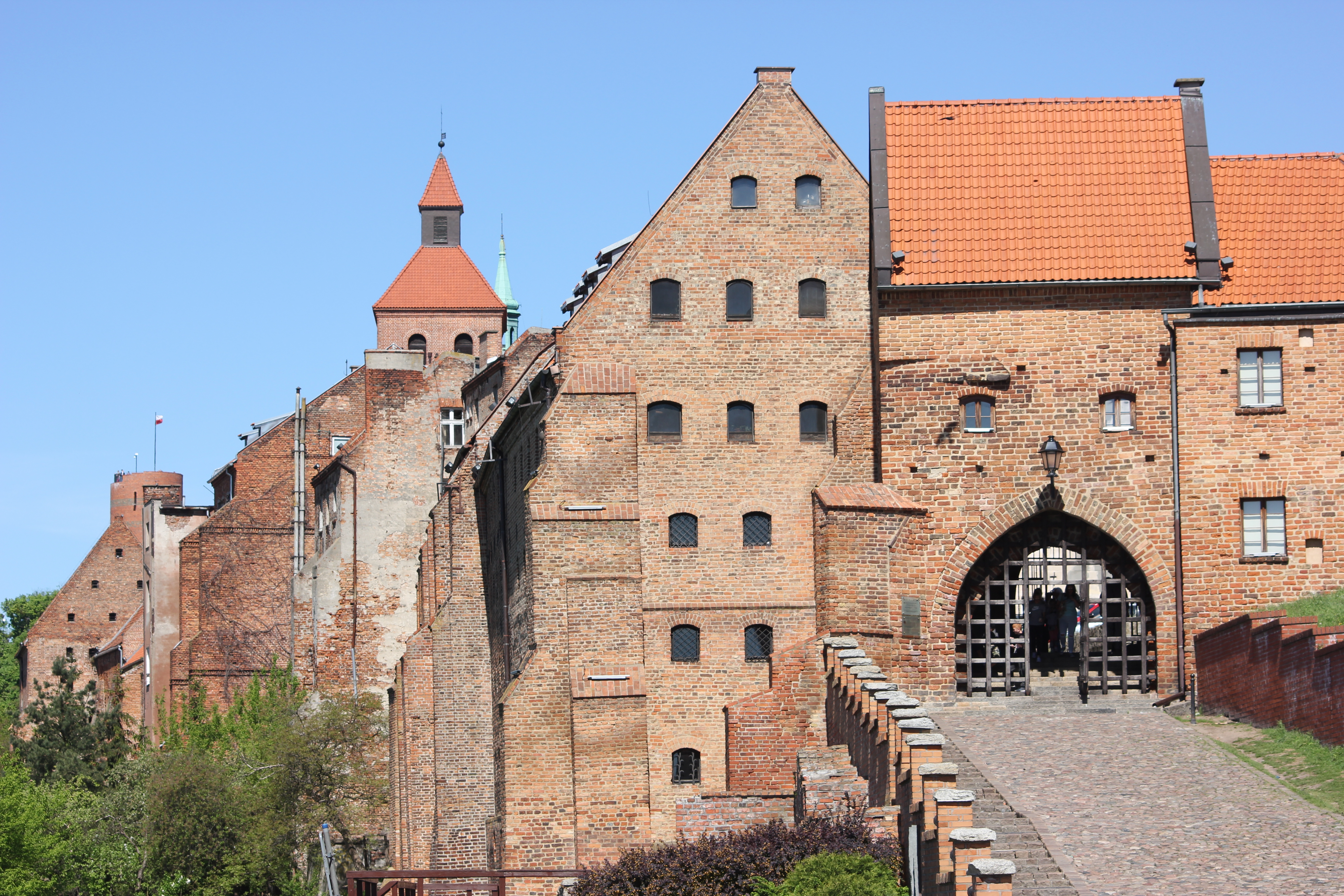
Gothic fortified Grudziądz Granaries, Historic Monument of Poland

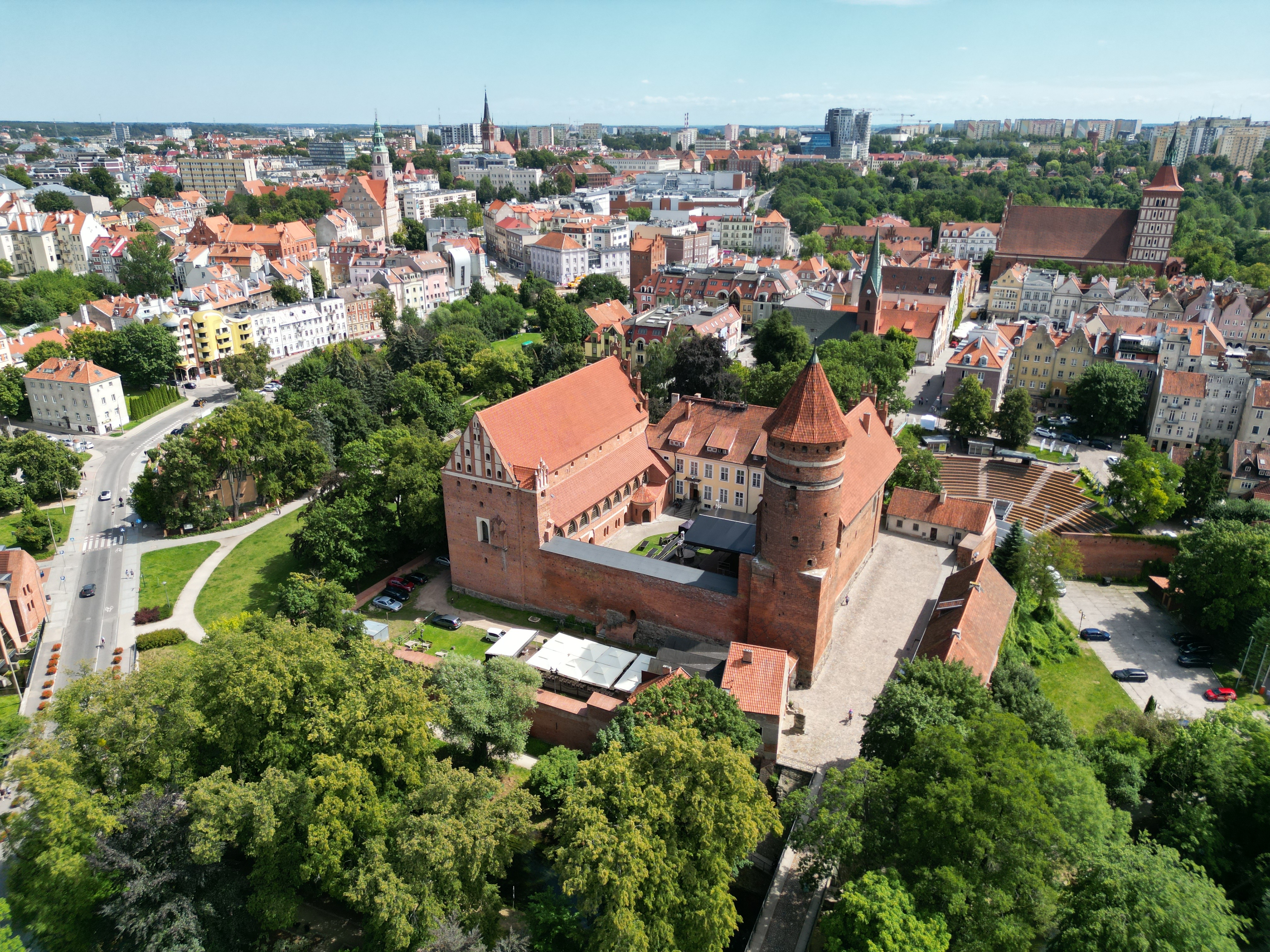
Olsztyn Old Town with the Gothic Olsztyn Castle, Historic Monument of Poland

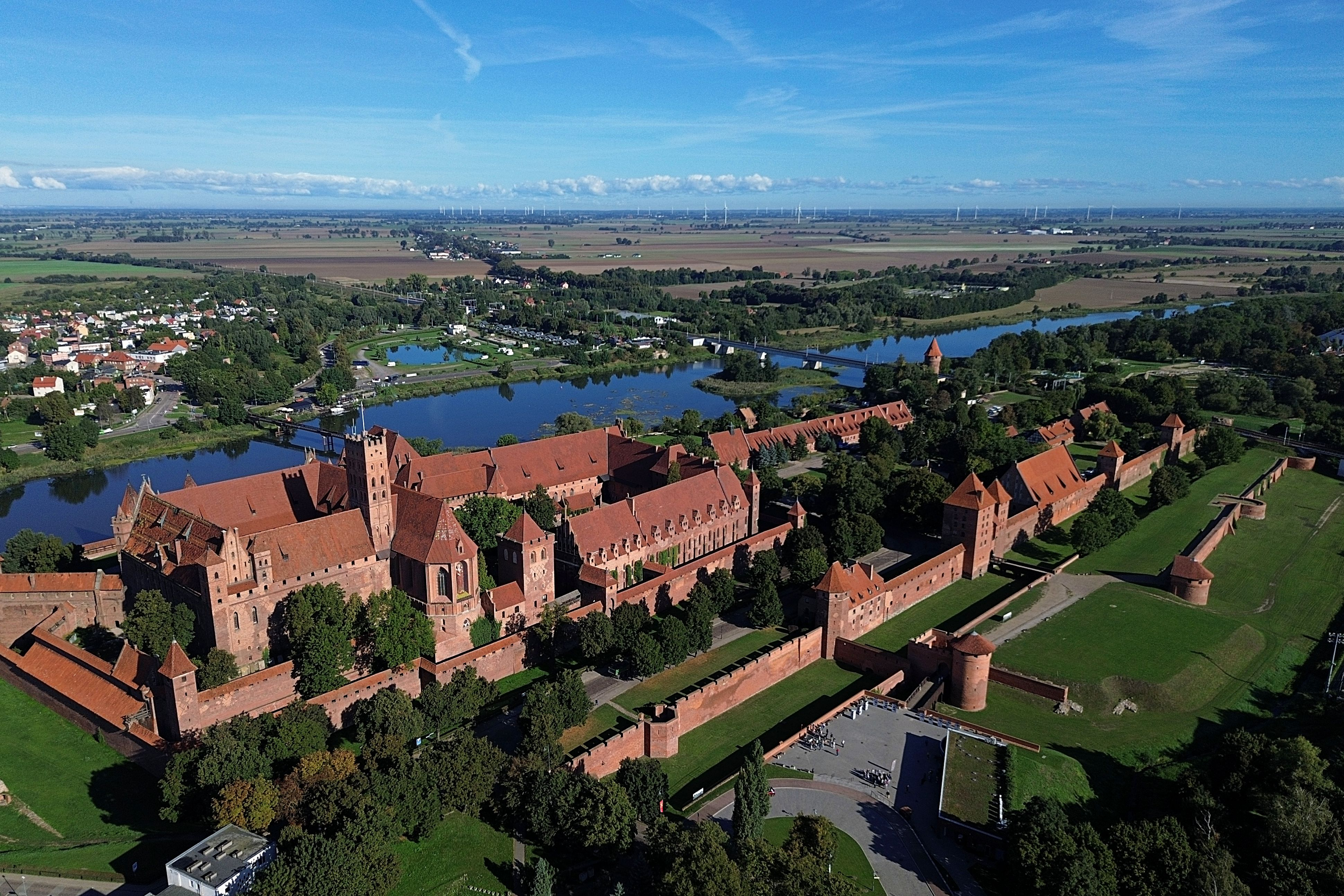
Malbork Castle, UNESCO World Heritage Site and Historic Monument of Poland

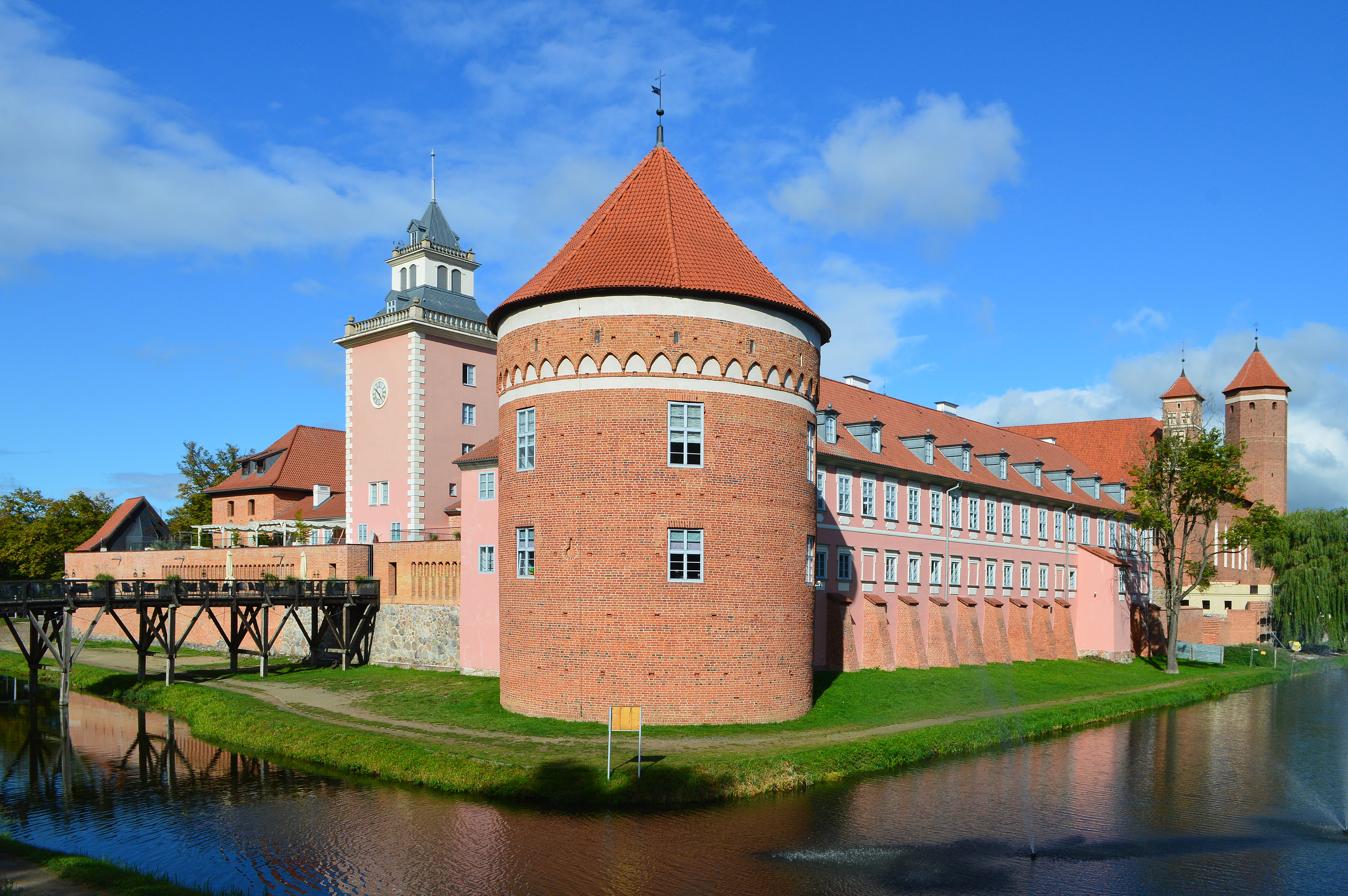
Gothic-Baroque Castle and Palace Complex in Lidzbark Warmiński, Historic Monument of Poland

Cities include:

In the Monastic state of Prussia	In the Duchy of Masovia	Elsewhere in Poland and Lithuania
Kulm (Chełmno) - 1233; Thorn (Toruń) - 1233; Marienwerder (Kwidzyn) - 1233; Radzyń Chełmiński - 1234; Königsberg (Kaliningrad) - 1286; Malbork - 1286; Dzierzgoń - 1288; Grudziądz - 1291; Tolkmicko - 1296; Gniew - 1297; Pasłęk - 1297; Nowe - 1301; Święta Siekierka (Mamonovo) - 1301; Iława - 1305; Zalewo - 1305 or 1320 or 1334; Łasin - 1306; Lidzbark Warmiński - 1308; Melzak (Pieniężno) - 1312; Cynty (Kornevo) - 1313; Orneta - 1313; Susz - c. 1314; Krzyżbork (Slavskoye) - 1315; Brodnica - 1317; Skarszewy - 1320; Lubawa - 1326; Dąbrówno - 1326; Morąg - 1327; Młynary - c. 1327 or 1338; Dobre Miasto - 1329; Ostróda - 1329; Prabuty - 1330; Kisielice - 1331; Biskupiec Pomorski - 1331; Wąbrzeźno - c. 1331; Bartoszyce - 1332; Miłomłyn - 1335; Górowo Iławeckie - 1335; Frydląd (Pravdinsk) - 1335; Welawa (Znamensk) - c. 1335; Reszel - 1337; Świecie - 1338; Jeziorany - 1338; Lębork - 1341; Gdańsk - 1343; Działdowo - 1344; Bytów - 1346; Tuchola - 1346; Olsztyn - 1348; Człuchów - 1348; Starogard - 1348; Puck - 1348; Sępopol - 1351; Nowe Miasto Lubawskie - 1353; Debrzno - 1354; Rastembork (Kętrzyn) - 1357; Łeba - 1357; Olsztynek - 1359; Wartembork (Barczewo) - 1364; Tczew - between 1364 and 1383; Nidzica - 1381; Biały Bór - 1382 or 1395; Bisztynek - 1385; Pasym - 1386; Biskupiec - 1395; Czarne - 1395; Kościerzyna - 1398; Gerdauen (Zheleznodorozhny) - 1398; Alembork (Druzhba) - 1400; Domnovo - 1400; Bobrowniki - 1403; Dryfort (Srokowo) - 1405; Nordenbork (Krylovo) - 1407; Ządźbork (Mrągowo) - c. 1407; Sztum - 1416; Ełk - 1445; Memel (Klaipėda) - 1475	Płock - 1237; Pułtusk - 1257; Gąbin - 1322 or earlier; Warsaw - 1334; Rawa - between 1345 and 1350; Bodzanów - 1351; Zaździerz - 1356; Bielsk - 1373; Ostrołęka - 1373 or 1427; Nowy Dwór Mazowiecki - 1374; Magnuszew - 1377; Różan - 1378; Błonie - 1380; Gostynin - 1382; Goszczyn - 1382 or 1386; Szreńsk - 1383; Kuczbork - 1384; Sochocin - 1385; Czersk - 1386; Nasielsk - 1386; Wyszogród - 1398; Ciechanów - 1400; Radzanów - 1400; Nowe Miasto nad Pilicą - 1400; Płońsk - c. 1400; Bieżuń - 1406; Budziszewice - 1407; Serock - 1417 or 1425; Łomża - 1418; Grójec - 1419; Nowe Miasto - 1420; Latowicz - 1420 or 1423; Mińsk Mazowiecki - c. 1420; Liw - 1421; Maków Mazowiecki - 1421; Janowo - 1421; Czerwińsk nad Wisłą - 1422; Garwolin - 1423; Kolno - 1425; Tykocin - 1425; Raciąż - 1425; Przasnysz - 1427; Głowno - 1427; Mława - 1429; Piaseczno - 1429; Zambrów - 1430 or earlier; Nur - 1434; Sochaczew - 1434; Ostrów Mazowiecka - 1434; Nowogród - 1434; Wizna - 1435; Wąsosz - 1436; Mszczonów - 1437; Osmolin - 1439; Mielnik - 1440; Bielsk Podlaski - 1440; Węgrów - 1441; Głowaczów - 1445; Zakroczym - 1448; Nadarzyn - 1453; Radziłów - 1466; Miastków Kościelny - 1472; Radzymin - 1475; Brok - 1501; Wyszków - 1502; Niedzbórz - 1505; Stanisławów - 1523; Siennica - 1526; Kalabona (Zwola Poduchowna) - 1526	Rypin - between 1323 and 1326; Górzno - 1327 or 1385; Lipno - 1349; Kamień Krajeński - 1359; Fordon - 1382; Wadowice - 1430; Skępe - 1445; Nieszawa - 1460; Janów Podlaski - 1465; Mordy - 1488; Medininkai (Varniai) - 1491; Mokobody - 1496; Waniewo - 1510; Narew - 1514; Dobrzyń nad Wisłą - 1519; Bolimów - 1519; Kowal - 1519; Kleszczele - 1523; Grabowo - 1524; Dobre - 1530; Goniądz - 1547; Karczew - 1548; Seroczyn - 1548; Osieck - 1558; Skuodas - 1572; Wejherowo - 1650; Korycin - 1671; Prosperów - 1701; Biała - 1723
In Ducal Prussia, vassal duchy of Poland
Tylża (Sovetsk) - 1552; Olecko - 1560; Gołdap - 1570; Węgorzewo - 1571; Wystruć (Chernyakhovsk) - 1583; Iławka (Bagrationovsk) - 1585; Łuczany (Giżycko) - 1623; Barciany - 1628; Labiawa (Polessk) - 1642; Pisz - 1645

Cities and towns for which it was a replacement of a previous municipal charter in italics.

Location of towns which obtained Chełmno Law in the 13th century (black), 14th century (red), 15th century (orange), 16th century (yellow) and 17th and 18th centuries (white) on the map of Poland
Location of towns which obtained Chełmno Law in the 15th century (orange) and 16th century (yellow) on the map of Lithuania

== See also ==
- German town law
- Lübeck law
- Magdeburg rights
- Håndfæstning

== Literature ==
- Kodeks dyplomatyczny ksiestwa Mazowieckiego, obejmujący bulle papieżów, przywileje królów polskich i książąt mazowieckich, tudzież nadania tak korporacyj jako i osób prywatnych (in Polish and Latin). Warszawa: Drukarnia Gazety Polskiej. 1863.
- Jus Culmense ex ultima revisione, oder das vollständige culmische Recht, mit Anmerkungen. Danzig: Johann Friedrich Battels, 1767.
- Baliński, Michał; Lipiński, Tymoteusz (1843). Starożytna Polska pod względem historycznym, jeograficznym, i statystycznym opisana (in Polish). Vol. I. Warszawa.
- Baliński, Michał; Lipiński, Tymoteusz (1844). Starożytna Polska pod względem historycznym, jeograficznym, i statystycznym opisana (in Polish). Vol. II. Warszawa.
- Białuński, Grzegorz (2017). ""Dla powszechnego rozwoju, podniesienia i poprawy naszego księstwa". Lokacje miast mazurskich w Prusach Książęcych (1525–1701)". Czasopismo Prawno-Historyczne (in Polish). Vol. LXIX, no. 2. ISSN 0070-2471.
- Janicka, Danuta. Prawo karne w trzech rewizjach prawa chełmińskiego z XVI wieku. Toruń: TNT, 1992. ISBN 83-85196-50-1
- Janicka, Danuta. Nauka o winie i karze w dziejach klasycznej szkoły prawa karnego w Niemczech w 1 połowie XIX wieku. Toruń: Wydaw. Uniwersytetu Mikołaja Kopernika, 1998. ISBN 83-231-0985-0
- Johanek, Peter. "Alter Kulm." In Die deutsche Literatur des Mittelalters. Verfasserlexikon, vol. 1, edited by Kurt Ruh, 267–269. Berlin: Auflage, 1978. ISBN 31-100-7264-5
- Rogatschewski, Alexander. "Zur Geschichte des 'Alten Kulms' und anderer preußischer Rechtsbücher nach St. Petersburger Quellen." In Deutschsprachige Literatur des Mittelalters im Östlichen Europa: Forschungsstand und Forschungsperspektiven, edited by R. G. Päsler and D. Schmidtke, 199–244. Heildelberg: Universitätsverlag Winter, 2006. ISBN 38-253-5157-2
- Päsler, Ralf G. Deutschsprachige Sachliteratur im Preußenland bis 1500: Untersuchungen zu ihrer Überlieferung, 197, 222–224, 243–252. Köln: Bohlau, 2003. ISBN 34-121-5502-0
- Sokołowski, Adam (2018). "Wokół lokacji Łomży". Studia Łomżyńskie (in Polish). XXVIII.
- Urban, William. The Prussian Crusade, 123–128. Lanham, MD: University Press of America, 1980. ISBN 08-191-1278-X
