= Przykory =

Przykory may refer to the following places:

- Przykory, Garwolin County in Masovian Voivodeship (east-central Poland)
- Przykory, Grójec County in Masovian Voivodeship (east-central Poland)
- Przykory, Płock County in Masovian Voivodeship (east-central Poland)
- Przykory, Wyszków County in Masovian Voivodeship (east-central Poland)
