= Zwola, Garwolin County =

Zwola
- Village
- Location within Poland
- Coordinates: 51°52′56″N 21°52′40″E
- Country: Poland
- Voivodeship: Masovian
- County: Garwolin
- Gmina: Miastków Kościelny

Zwola [ˈzvɔla] is a village in the administrative district of Gmina Miastków Kościelny, within Garwolin County, Masovian Voivodeship, in east-central Poland.
