= Gmina Miastków Kościelny =

Gmina Miastków Kościelny Miastków Kościelny Commune
- Gmina
- Coat of arms

- Coordinates (Miastków Kościelny): 51°54′N 21°50′E
- Country: Poland
- Voivodeship: Masovian
- County: Garwolin
- Seat: Miastków Kościelny

Area
  - Total: 85.24 km^{2} (32.91 sq mi)

Population (2006)
  - Total: 5,019
  - Density: 58.88/km^{2} (152.5/sq mi)
- Website: http://www.miastkowkoscielny.pl/

Gmina Miastków Kościelny is a rural gmina (administrative district) in Garwolin County, Masovian Voivodeship, in east-central Poland. Its seat is the village of Miastków Kościelny, which lies approximately 14 kilometres (9 mi) east of Garwolin and 68 km (42 mi) south-east of Warsaw.

The gmina covers an area of 85.24 square kilometres (32.9 sq mi), and as of 2006 its total population is 5,019.

== Villages ==
Gmina Miastków Kościelny contains the villages and settlements of Brzegi, Glinki, Kruszówka, Kujawy, Miastków Kościelny, Oziemkówka, Przykory, Ryczyska, Stary Miastków, Wola Miastkowska, Zabruzdy, Zabruzdy-Kolonia, Zasiadały, Zgórze, Zwola and Zwola Poduchowna.

== Neighbouring gminas ==
Gmina Miastków Kościelny is bordered by the gminas of Borowie, Górzno, Stoczek Łukowski, Wola Mysłowska and Żelechów.
