= Oziemkówka =

- Village
- Location within Poland
- Coordinates: 51°55′02″N 21°45′12″E
- Country: Poland
- Voivodeship: Masovian
- County: Garwolin
- Gmina: Miastków Kościelny

Oziemkówka [ɔʑɛmˈkufka] is a village in the administrative district of Gmina Miastków Kościelny, within Garwolin County, Masovian Voivodeship, in east-central Poland.
