= Church of the Exaltation of the Holy Cross, Narew =

Orthodox church in Narew, Poland

Church of the Exaltation of the Holy Cross
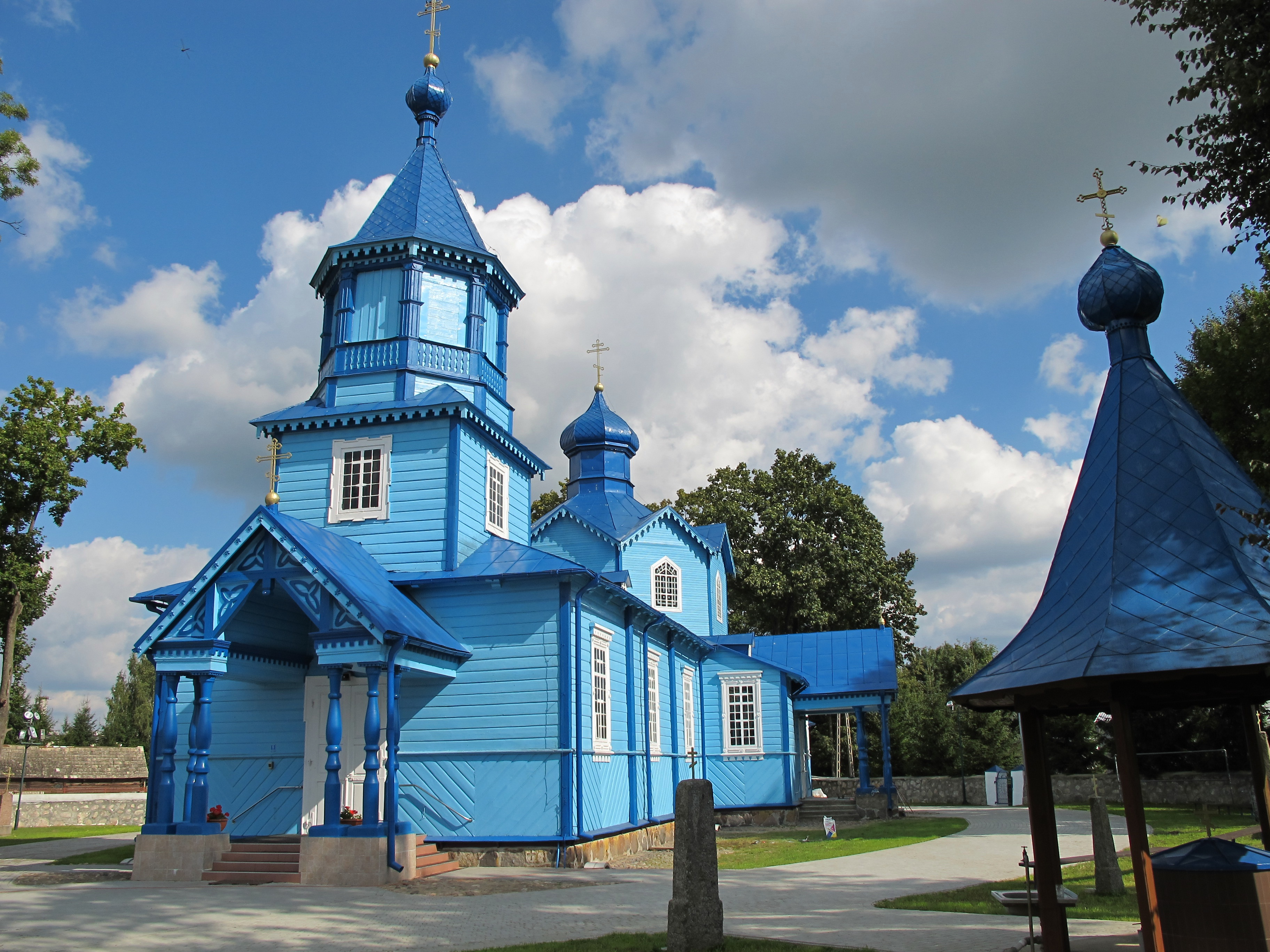

Religion
- Affiliation: Eastern Orthodoxy
- Rite: Polish Orthodox Church
- Ecclesiastical or organizational status: Active Orthodox church
- Year consecrated: 1882; 23 July 2020 (most recent)

Location
- Location: Narew
- Country: Poland
- Geographic coordinates: 52°54′44.6″N 23°31′05.1″E

Architecture
- Completed: 1885
- Materials: Wood

The Church of the Exaltation of the Holy Cross is an Orthodox parish church located in Narew, Poland. It belongs to the Narew Deanery of the Diocese of Warsaw and Bielsk within the Polish Orthodox Church.

Historical records document an Orthodox church in Narew from the 16th century. Following the Union of Brest in 1596, the local parish adopted its provisions no later than 1635. The original parish church operated until the late 18th century, when it was replaced due to severe deterioration. During the Uniate period, the church's interior became significantly Latinized. Inventories indicate the absence of an iconostasis (though some Orthodox icons were likely retained), with side altars and a typically Western image of Our Lady of Sorrows in the main altar added. These elements persisted after 1839, when, following the Synod of Polotsk, the parish, along with its diocese, joined the Russian Orthodox Church. An iconostasis was installed in 1868, and veneration of the Our Lady of Sorrows image continued.

In the 1880s, the Uniate-era church was relocated to the Narew cemetery, and a new church was constructed in its place. By the early 20th century, the parish served over 3,000 faithful. Parish activities ceased in 1915 due to the evacuation of Orthodox populations. Evacuated villagers took revered icons, which were never returned. The church resumed operations after 1918 and has remained active since. In 1990, a fire severely damaged the building, destroying its historic interior. The restored church was reconsecrated four years later.

== History ==
=== Early Orthodox church ===
The Orthodox church in Narew was likely established in 1529. The earliest documented reference to a "Ruthenian" church in Narew appears in a 1560 land survey by Stanisław Dziewiałtowski. The survey does not specify the church's dedication but locates it on the left side of Bielska Street from the market square, consistent with the current parish church's location. A legend recorded in the 1900 parish chronicle suggests Prince Iwan Wiśniowiecki founded the church after seeing an icon of Saint Anthony of Kyiv while traveling from Warsaw to Vilnius, prompting him to build a chapel in his honor. Although there is no definitive evidence confirming Wiśniowiecki as the founder, his wife, Anastazja Olizarowicz, transferred nearby Narewka estates to him in 1518. Another legend mentions monks from Kyiv bringing an icon of Saint Anthony to Narew in the 15th century. Veneration of Saint Anthony remains significant in the Narew parish, with his feast day, alongside the patronal feast, being a major celebration.

A 1578 tax register lists an Orthodox priest from Narew among the Bielsk Podlaski region's clergy. The church likely belonged to the Bielsk Deanery of the Eparchy of Volodymyr and Brest. No details about its furnishings are available, as the earliest description dates to 1727.

=== Uniate period ===
The Narew parish adopted the Union of Brest no later than 1635. During the Uniate period, the church's furnishings gradually adopted Latin elements, a process intensified after the Synod of Zamość, which recommended installing organs, confessionals, and side altars in Uniate churches. The Narew church retained some Orthodox elements. A 1727 canonical visitation record notes eight large icons, four described as "Muscovite", suggesting Orthodox origins. The church had a two-tier iconostasis with royal doors and one northern deacon's door, featuring six icons in the lower tier. The chancel contained an altar with a "very old" image of God the Father and a sacrificial table (in Church Slavonic, zhertvennik) with an icon of Christ the Savior. A second altar with an image of the Virgin Mary was in the church porch. The church also housed a ciborium, a paten, two blessing crosses, a processional cross, and liturgical books, including the printed Kazusy Zamojskie. The church's condition was poor, with a shingle roof and windows needing repairs, and the adjacent bell tower risked collapse, prompting renovation orders.

==== New Uniate church ====
In the late 18th century, a new Uniate church was built in Narew, a single-domed, hexagonal, tripartite structure clad with planks and covered with shingles. Visitation records from 1811 and 1818 describe a heavily Latinized interior, including a "small organ with five stops". The main altar in the chancel featured a large image of Our Lady of Sorrows with a silver crown, belt, rays, and sword, covered in a copper dress, venerated with numerous votive offerings and concealable by an image of the Crucified Jesus. The altar included a mensa with a ciborium. The church had two side altars with images of Saint Anthony (covered by Saint Nicholas) and the Virgin Mary (covered by Saint Anthony). Other icons included one of Saint Praxedes, and two processional crosses were present, but no iconostasis.

Until 1797, the Narew parish was part of the Uniate Diocese of Volodymyr. In 1797, it joined the newly established Diocese of Surpaśl, which was dissolved in 1809. That year, by decree of Tsar Alexander I, the former Diocese of Supraśl territories were incorporated into the Uniate Diocese of Brest. In 1828, after reorganization of the Uniate Church in the Russian Empire, the Narew parish joined the Lithuanian Diocese. In 1811, the parish had 1,158 faithful.

A bell tower built with the church was in poor condition by the early 19th century, requiring renovation. It housed five church bells, the oldest from 1758, with others from 1760 and 1813, the 1760 bell cast in Gdańsk.

In 1827, Joseph Semashko, a Uniate bishop advocating for union with Orthodoxy, drafted a memorandum on assimilating the Uniate Church with the Russian Orthodox Church. In 1834, the Uniate Spiritual College ordered the use of Orthodox liturgical books and restoration of iconostases. These changes, aimed at preparing Podlachia Uniates for conversion to Orthodoxy under Bishop Joseph Semashko in the 1830s, had limited impact on the Narew church's appearance.

=== Orthodox church until World War I ===
In 1839, following the Synod of Polotsk, the Narew church joined the Russian Orthodox Church and was part of the Diocese of Vilnius and Lithuania, Bielsk Deanery. An iconostasis was installed in 1868, a two-tier structure with royal doors depicting the Annunciation and the Four Evangelists. The lower tier had icons (142 × 71.2 cm) of Saint Anthony of Kyiv, Alexander Nevsky, Archangel Michael (on northern deacon's doors), the Virgin Mary, Christ the Savior, Saint Symeon (on southern deacon's doors), and the Exaltation of the Holy Cross. The upper tier had smaller icons of Kyiv and Moscow metropolitans Jonah of Moscow, Philip II, Alexius, and Peter of Moscow, plus martyrs Nikander and Stephen, Cyril and Methodius, Sergius of Radonezh, and Mitrophan of Voronezh. The chancel had a table altar with an antimension and baldachin, a sacrificial table, and a zinc cross with enameled images of God the Father, the Virgin Mary, John Chrysostom, and Golgotha. An icon of Christ in Gethsemane was on the chancel wall.

Veneration of Our Lady of Sorrows continued despite its absence in Byzantine tradition. In 1885, when a new church was built, this image was carefully restored, alongside the icon of Saint Anthony. Other icons included the Crucifixion, Nativity, Virgin Mary, Christ the Savior, and Saint Nicholas.In 1846, the parish had 2,244 faithful, increasing to 2,284 in 1847. A parson's house was located nearby.

==== New Orthodox church ====
Construction of a new Orthodox church began in 1881 under Father Antoni Kuźmiński, with approval from eparchial authorities, and was completed by Father Jan Kłoczkowski after Kuźmiński's death. The church was dedicated on 9 May 1885. The older church was moved to the cemetery, replacing an old chapel, and rededicated to the Kazan Icon of the Mother of God.

In 1900, the church joined the Eparchy of Grodno and Volkovysk. By 1905, it served 3,098 faithful. New icons added included Saint Barbara, Saint George, the Image of Christ Not Made by Hands, and the Exaltation of the Holy Cross, plus a 1600 Gospel Book. In 1908, an ornate brick fence with a gate was built around the church.

In 1915, Narew's Orthodox residents were evacuated. Church furnishings were packed into eight crates and sent to a monastery in Yaroslavl. In 1917, a workers' and soldiers' committee seized some items, including the revered icons of Saint Anthony and Our Lady of Sorrows.

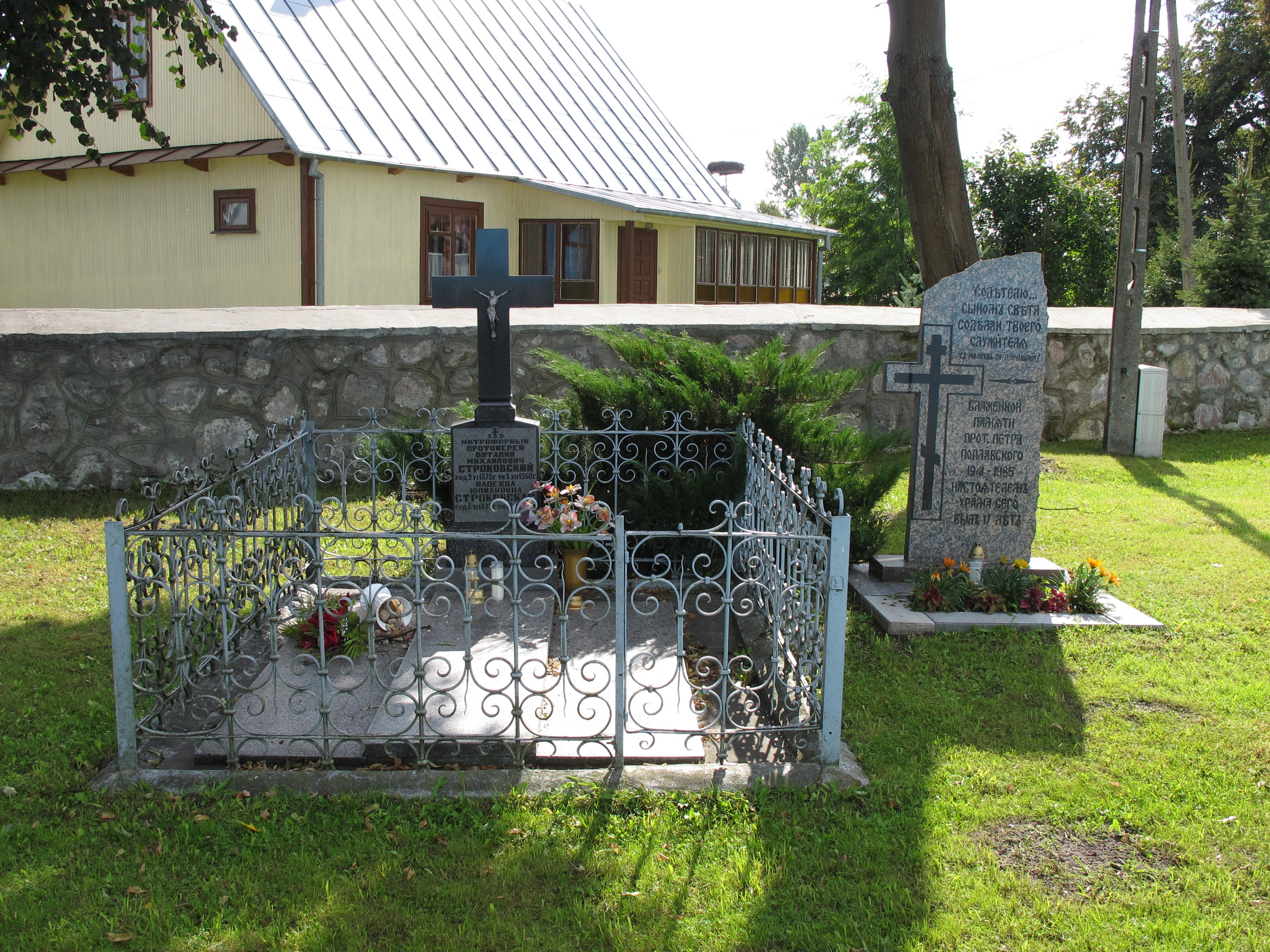
Grave of Father Witalij Strokowski, long-time parson, and a memorial stone for Archpriest Piotr Popławski, adjacent to the church

During the interwar period, the Narew church operated as a state-funded parish. In 1938, it served 2,840 faithful. Icons of local saints Athanasius of Brest and Gabriel of Białystok were acquired. After World War II, with changes to the Polish Orthodox Church's diocesan boundaries, the parish joined the Diocese of Warsaw and Bielsk, and since the 1960s, it has been part of the Narew Deanery.

In 1975, the church housed an 18th-century copy of the Our Lady of Sorrows icon. In 1985, Father Piotr Popławski (1941–1985), the parson, died under unclear circumstances.

On 12 April 1990, a fire during the Great Thursday Passion Gospel service destroyed the church's interior, including the 18th-century Our Lady of Sorrows icon. One parishioner died attempting to save the altar cross, though some furnishings were rescued. The restored church, with new icons and an iconostasis, was rededicated on 25 September 1994 by Metropolitan Bazyli Doroszkiewicz. That year, an ornate well for blessing water was built nearby.

The church was listed in the Registry of Cultural Property on 31 December 1990 under number 746.

By the early 21st century, the parish had fewer than 1,000 faithful. In the 2010s, the church was renovated and rededicated on 23 July 2020 by Archbishop Abel Popławski.

== Architecture ==
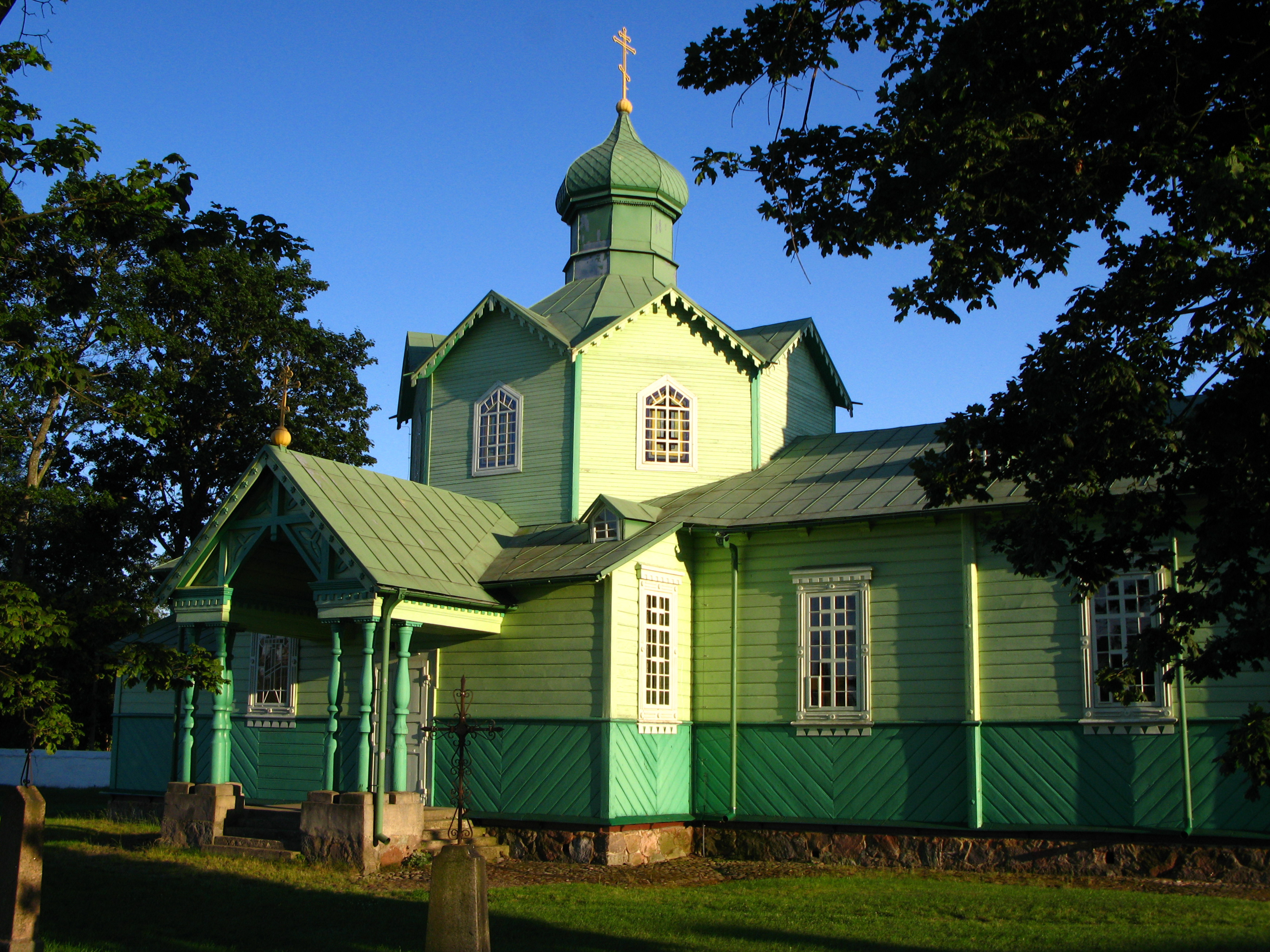
Side entrance and dome of the church before renovation and repainting

The Church of the Exaltation of the Holy Cross is a wooden, oriented structure built on a Latin cross plan with a stone-cement foundation. It features a log construction clad with planks. The transept matches the nave's width. The roof over the nave is gable, over the chancel is three-pitched, over the bell tower is four-pitched at the base and octagonal above. A dome on a tholobate with a multi-pitched roof sits at the intersection of the main and side naves. The chancel connects to an apse and two pastophoria. The rectangular church porch adjoins two side rooms. The front and side nave entrances are adorned with porticos, each with six columns.

== Bibliography ==
- Korniluk, Bogumił (2016). "Historia parafii Podwyższenia Świętego Krzyża w Narwi" [History of the Parish of the Exaltation of the Holy Cross in Narew]. Kalendarz Prawosławny (in Polish). Warsaw: Warszawska Metropolia Prawosławna. ISSN 1425-2171.
- Sosna, Grzegorz; Troc-Sosna, Antonina (2006). Święte miejsca i cudowne ikony. Prawosławne sanktuaria na Białostocczyźnie [Holy Places and Miraculous Icons: Orthodox Sanctuaries in the Białystok Land] (in Polish). Białystok: Orthdruk. ISBN 83-85368-69-8.
- Michaluk, Dorota (1996). Z dziejów Narwi i okolic. W 480 rocznicę nadania prawa chełmińskiego 1514–1994 [From the History of Narew and Its Surroundings: On the 480th Anniversary of Granting Chełmno Law 1514–1994] (in Polish). Białystok, Narew: Białostockie Towarzystwo Kulturalne. ISBN 83-902707-0-6.
