= Old Town Hall, Toruń =

Medieval seat of the municipal authorities of Toruń

Coordinates: 53°00′38″N 18°36′16″E

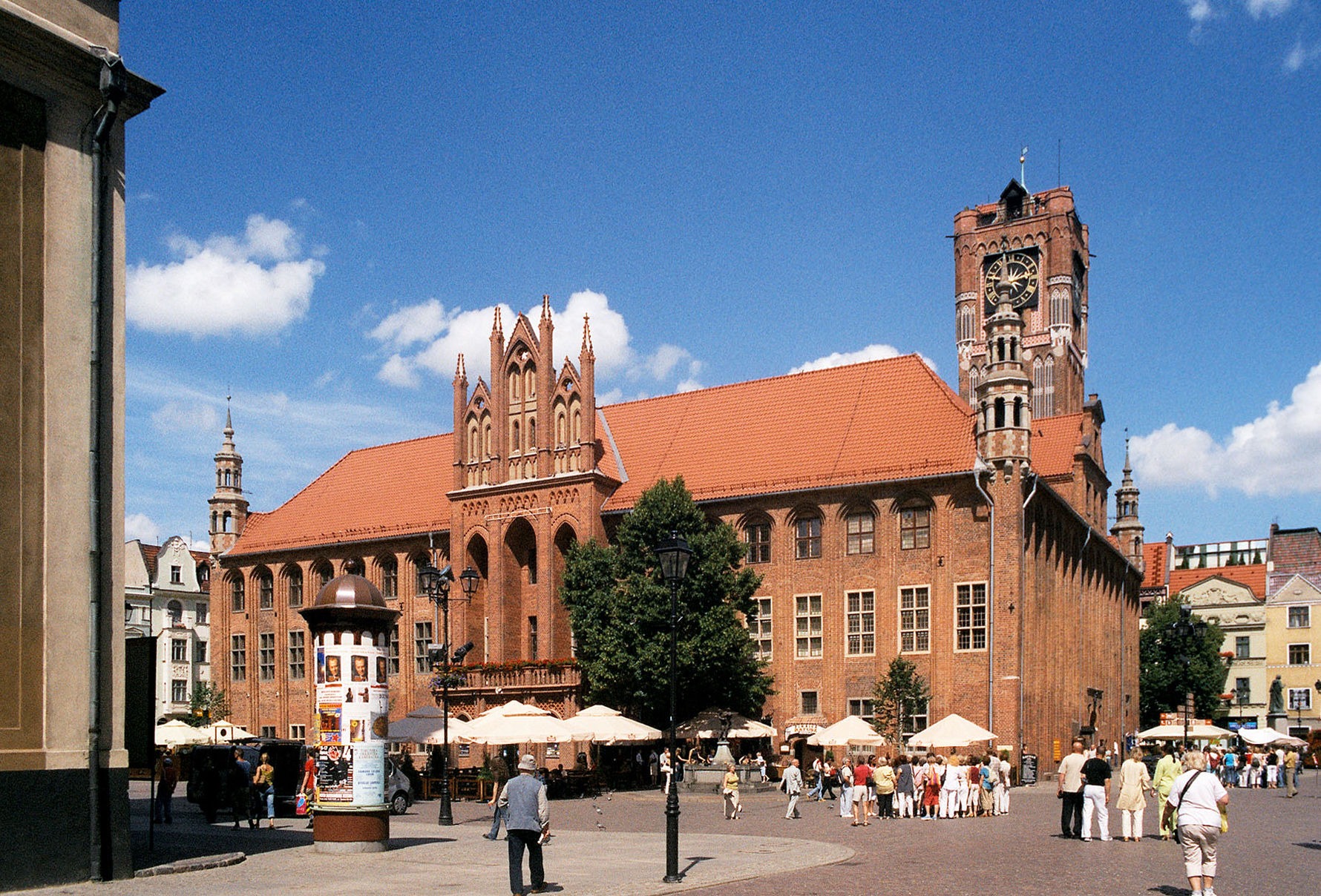
City hall seen from the west

The Old Town City Hall in Toruń is the main secular building of Toruń's Old Town, a Gothic building created in stages during the 13th and 14th centuries, reconstructed in the 17th century and rebuilt after destruction in the 18th century, one of the most outstanding examples of medieval city architecture in central Europe, the main seat of the District Museum in Toruń.

== Location ==
The City Hall is located in the Old Town Complex, on the Old Town Market Square.

== History ==
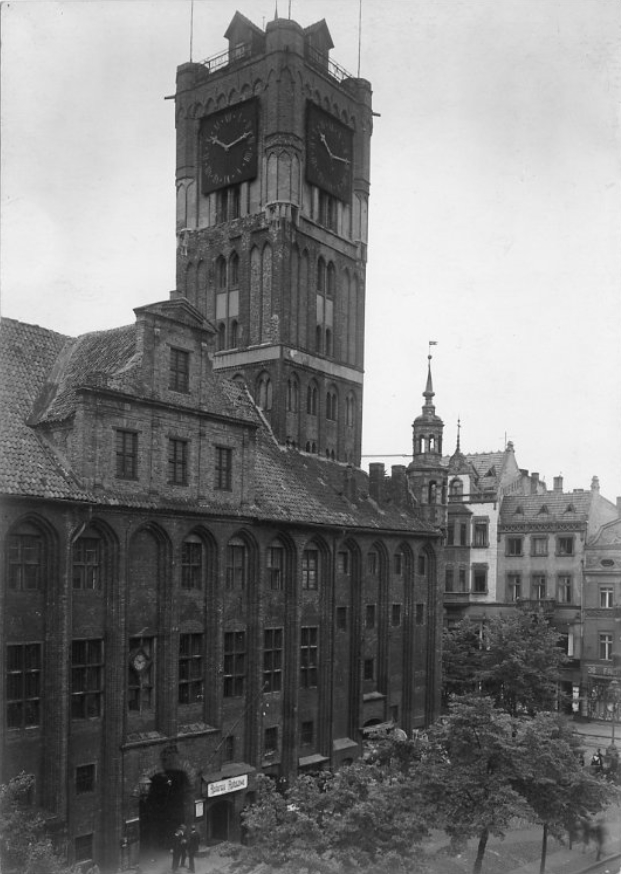
City hall in the interwar period

Original buildings of the city hall grew gradually during the 13th and 14th centuries. The merchant's house with its cloth hall (domus forensis) was probably built on the place of the present western wing on the basis of the privilege granted in 1259 by Prussian master Gerhard von Hirzberg. Another privilege for the construction of the tower, stalls and bread benches, on the place of today's eastern wing of the city hall, comes from 1274. According to the reconstruction by E. Gąsiorowski, at the end of the 13th century, the Old Town Market Square consisted of two elongated, parallel buildings. There was a merchant's house to the west and a building with stalls and bread benches to the east. The walls of both buildings were connected by curtain walls. On the south side, there was a tower adjacent to the bread stalls and benches, extended by two storeys in 1385 and preserved in this form to this day.

The present shape of the city hall is a result of an extensive construction project from the years 1391-1399, carried out in the Gothic style, probably under the direction of the Polish town constructor, master Andrew, based on the privilege of grand master Konrad von Wallenrode from 1393 (the privilege was issued during the construction). Old commercial buildings were demolished at that time, leaving only the tower. The administrative, commercial and judicial functions were combined in one building, which was a unique solution in Europe at the time. The city hall took the form of a four-winged building on a 44 × 52 m rectangular plan, with an internal courtyard accessible through four gates in the middle of each wing. The tower was based on the Flemish beffroi towers. It was covered with a high Gothic roof (destroyed in 1703), which was a distinctive element of the former skyline of the city.

Location of the city hall on the plan of the Old Town

A Mannerist reconstruction carried out in 1602-1605 on the initiative of Mayor Henry Stroband and probably designed by Antoni van Obberghen consisted of raising the building by one floor. It did not erase the Gothic character of the city hall, as the architect, extending the Gothic recesses, ended them with sharp arches, while introducing elements known from the architecture of Gdańsk - corner hanging turrets and roofs with Dutch decoration in the middle of each wing. The reconstruction of the Toruń City Hall is an interesting testimony to the respect of the Gothic form by the Mannerist architect.

In 1703, during the siege of the city by the Swedish army, a serious fire of the city hall broke out. Almost all the interior design was destroyed as a result, the roofs collapsed and the building remained without a roof until 1722. In the years 1722-1737, the building was rebuilt - new roofs were built, the interiors were reconstructed, and an avant-corps with late Baroque forms was added from the west to strengthen the wall in danger of collapse. Designs to rebuild the entire city hall in the late Baroque style, developed by G. B. Cocchi, also existed. In 1869 the Baroque avant-corps was replaced by a neo-Gothic one, which has been preserved until today. In the 19th century some of the interiors were also reconstructed.

A general renovation and adaptation works for the museum were carried out between 1957 and 1964. The most important works included strengthening the walls and vaults, restoring the interiors to their former appearance by demolishing nineteenth-century partition walls, and unveiling medieval architectural elements, walled up at a later time. The 18th century wooden roof truss was also replaced by a new one made of steel.

Between 2003 and 2005, restoration works were carried out, as a result of which the tower's former glory was restored (tracery painting decorations were reconstructed, the viewing terrace and the clock were renovated), all facades (including the inner courtyard facades), four corner towers, and the roof were renovated. The building's illumination was also installed.

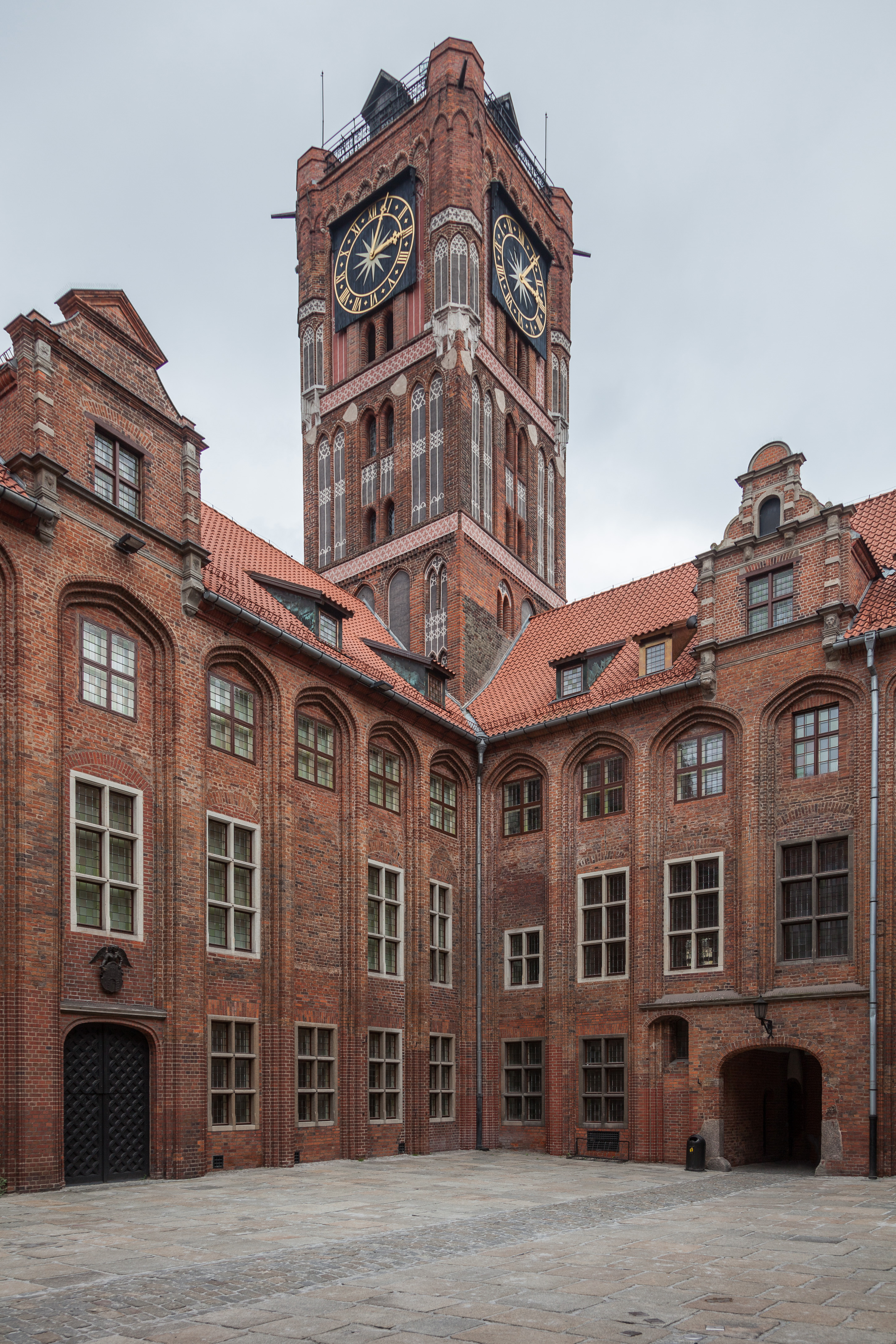

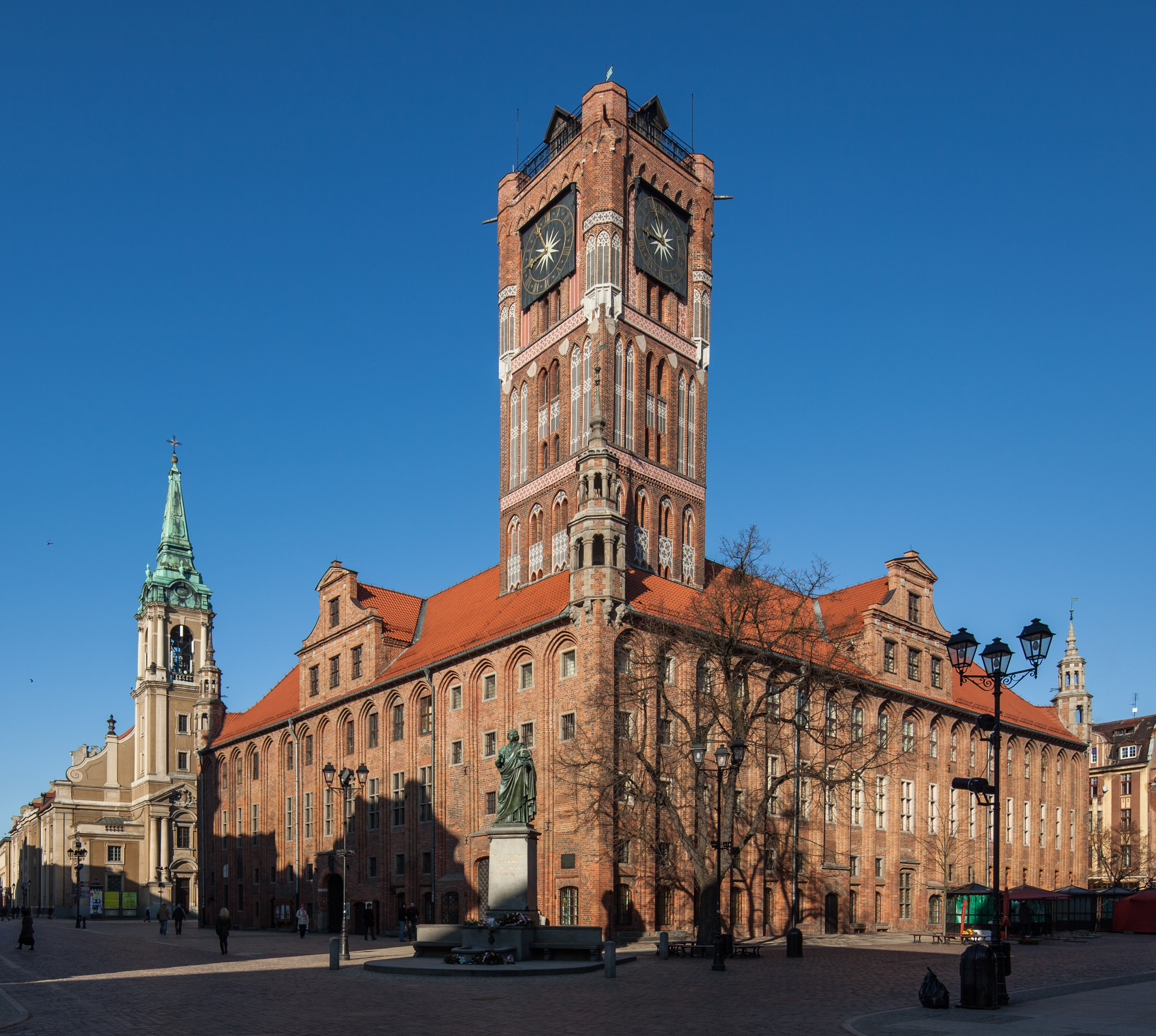

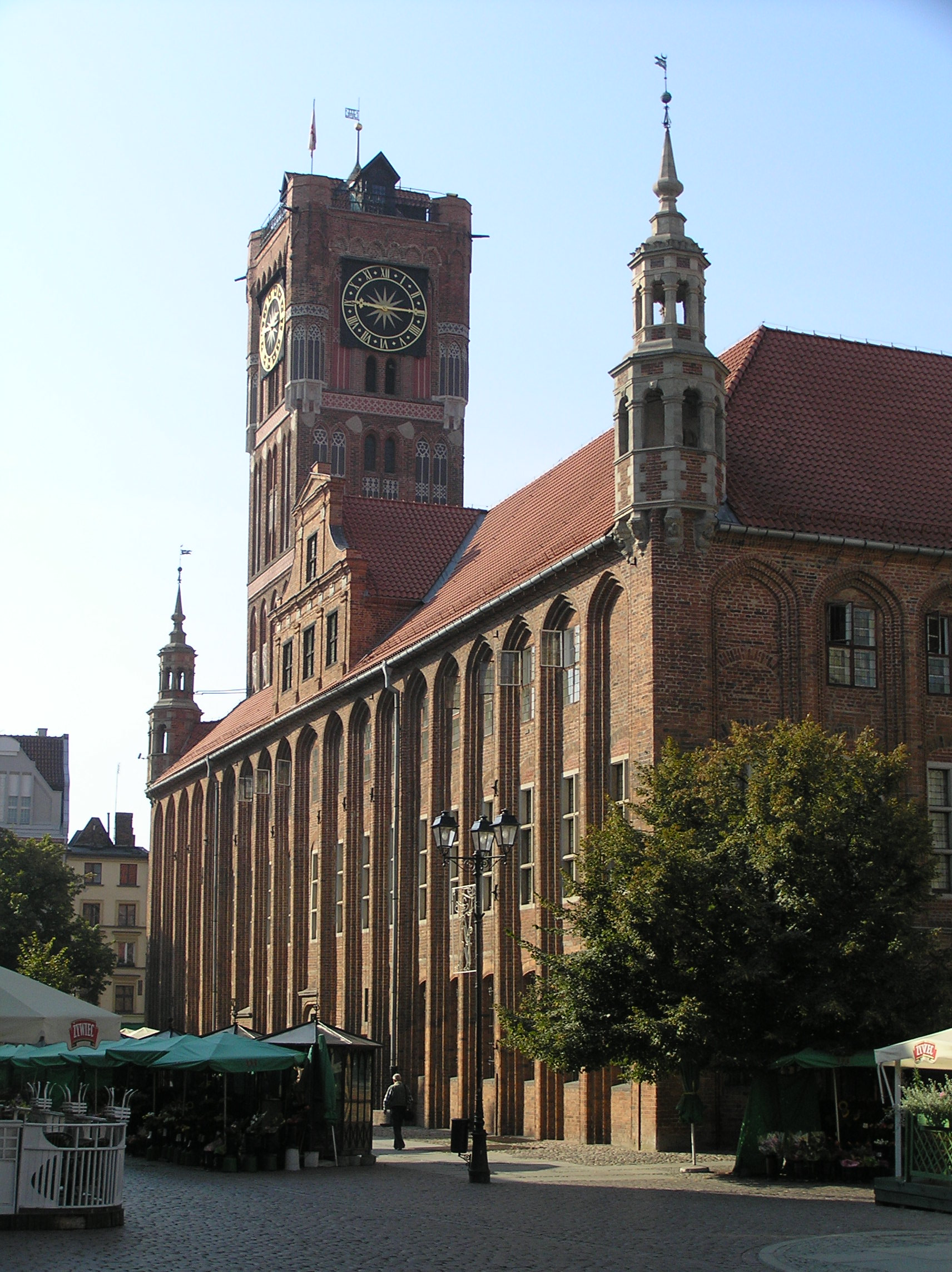

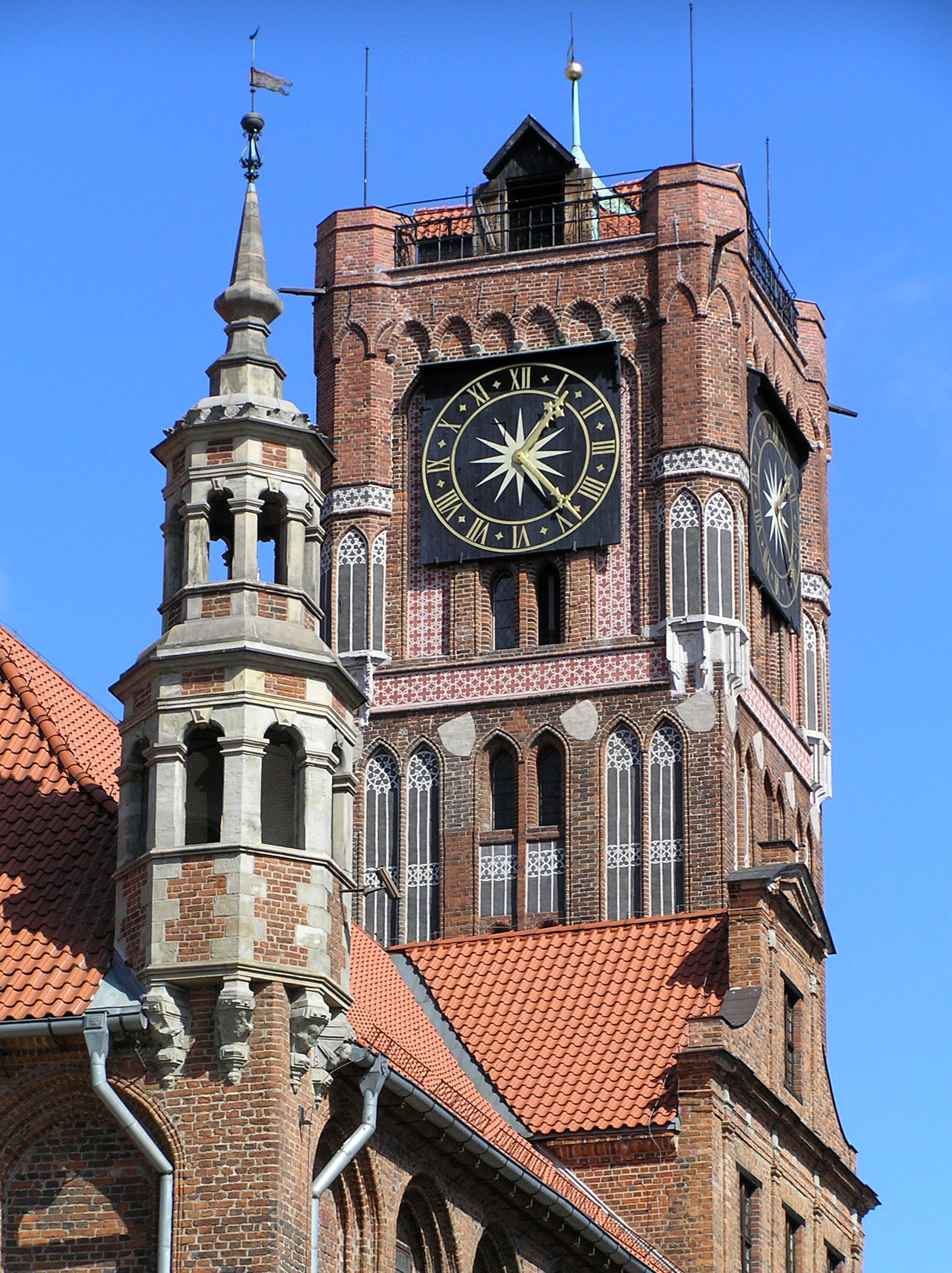

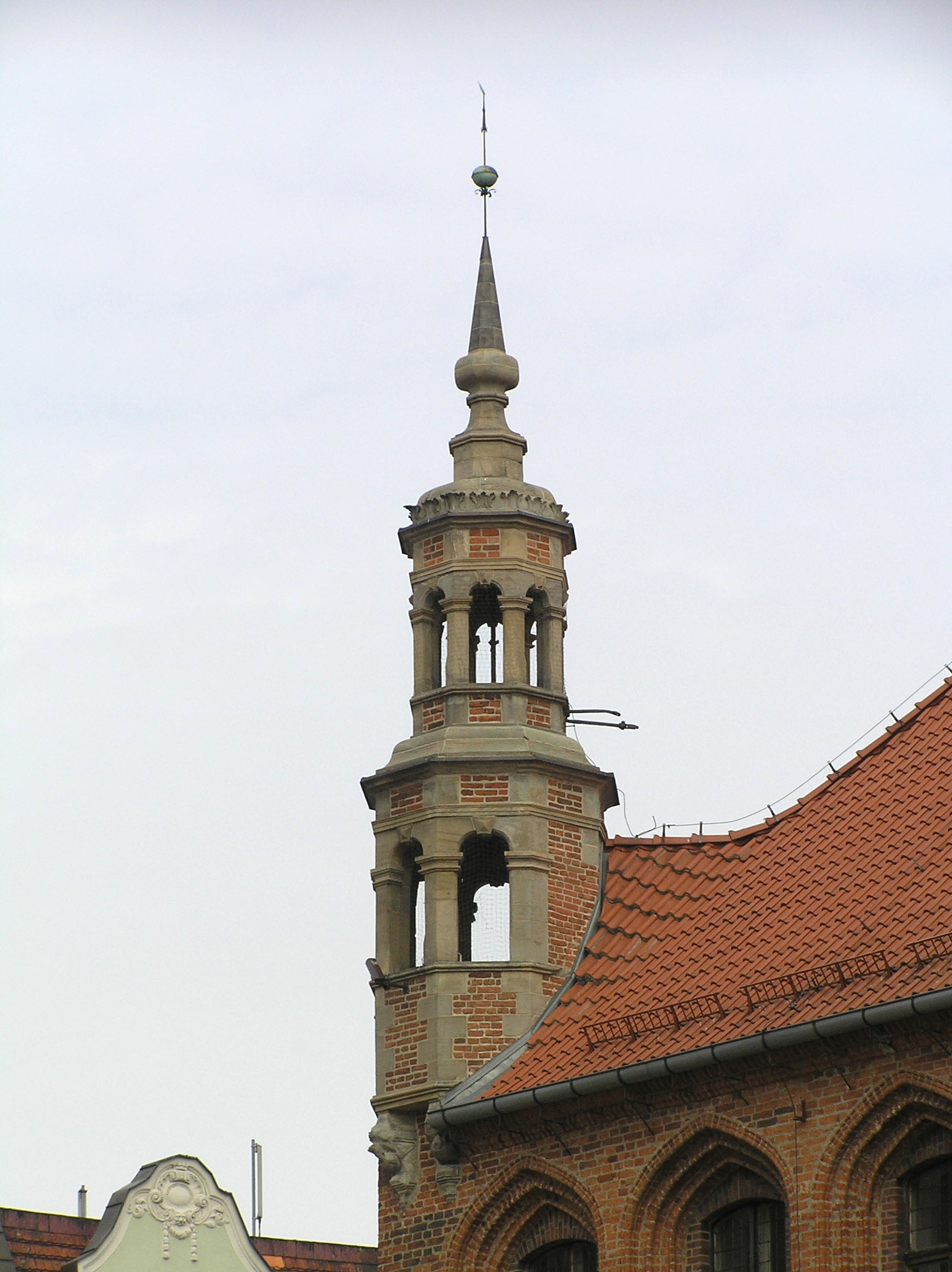

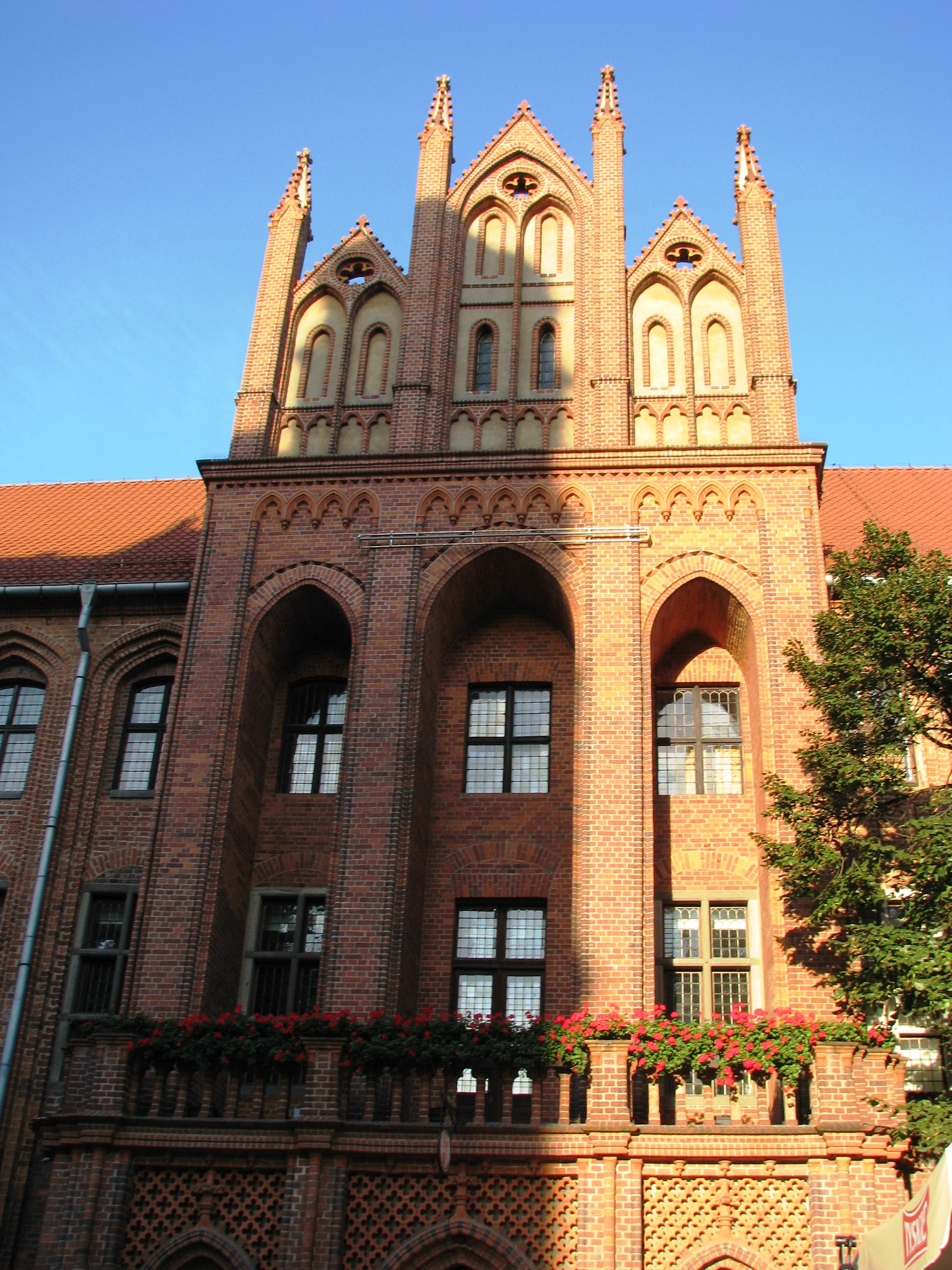

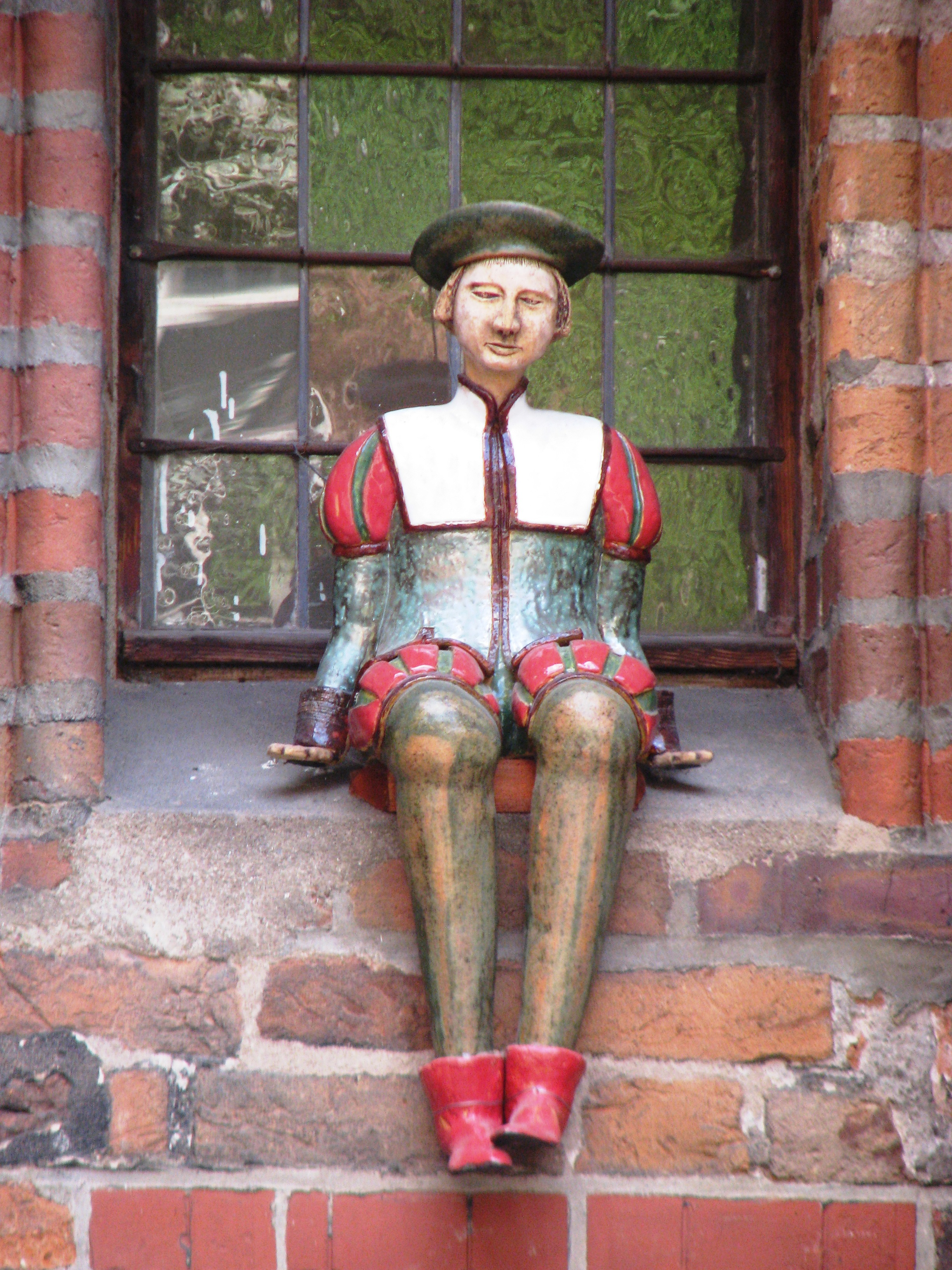

== Description ==
The city hall is located close to the center of the market square, slightly shifted to the east. The plan is a rectangle measuring about 44 × 52 m, with an internal courtyard. At the junction of the southern and eastern wings there is a quadrilateral tower in the type of Flemish guard towers (beffroi). All wings as well as the courtyard have cellars. The cellar ceiling under the east wing is supported by massive stone columns. The articulation of all elevations (including those from the courtyard side) is unified and consists of high, narrow recesses with strongly profiled corners closed by a flattened sharp arch, passing through the entire building. The corners are highlighted with two-storey, octagonal towers.

The ground floor housed the so-called "rich stalls" and bread benches in the eastern wing. The western wing housed the cloth hall. There is a room of the former city scales in the north-eastern corner, in the northern wing, east of the passage, a former courtroom is located. Most of the rooms on the ground floor are vaulted. The outer sections of each wing of the city hall (both from the side of the Market Square and the courtyard) were occupied by rows of small commercial stalls, built inwards, originally open only to the outside and not connected to the rest of the ground floor rooms. This forced a unique way of lighting the rooms located in the middle of the wings (bread benches, cloth halls and others) by means of windows located above the roofs of these stalls.

The first floor was used for representative purposes and housed the Council Hall, the meeting place of the City Council. The rich decoration of this hall from 1602-1603, destroyed in a fire in 1703, consisted of wall panelling with paintings by the Gdańsk painter Anton Mōller as well as a painting on the ceiling. One can assume that the decoration of this hall was as luxurious as that of the Red Hall of the Gdańsk Main Town Hall. The largest room on the first floor, the Great Municipal Hall, was a place of important city events, where kings were hosted, as well as Sejms and Sejmiks of the States of Royal Prussia. In 1645, talks between Protestants and Catholics, known as Colloquium charitativum, were held there. The Royal Hall is located in the northeast corner, where King Jan Olbracht died on 17 June 1501. Numerous wooden portals and doors from the time of the reconstruction in the 18th century, decorated with intarsia (e.g. the door to the Council Hall from 1735 with figures of Minerva and Apollo, to the Royal Hall from 1767 with figure of Stanisław August Poniatowski) have been preserved on the first floor.

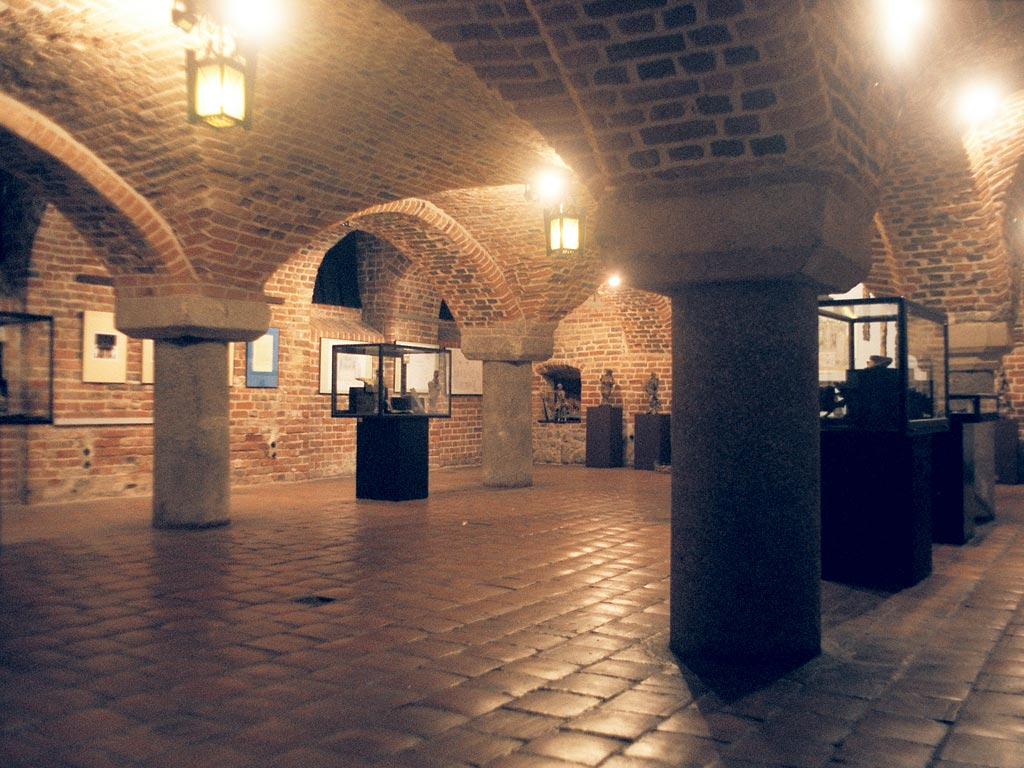
The Gdańsk Cellar under the east wing

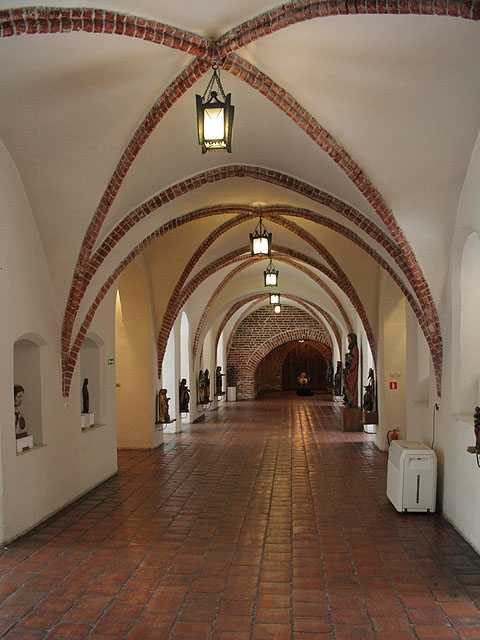
Former bread benches on the ground floor of the eastern wing, now a gallery of Gothic art

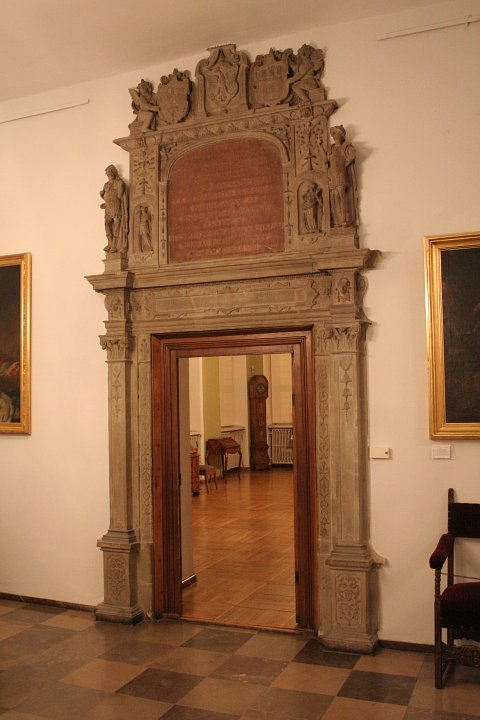
Portal to the Royal Hall, created during the reconstruction of 1602-1605

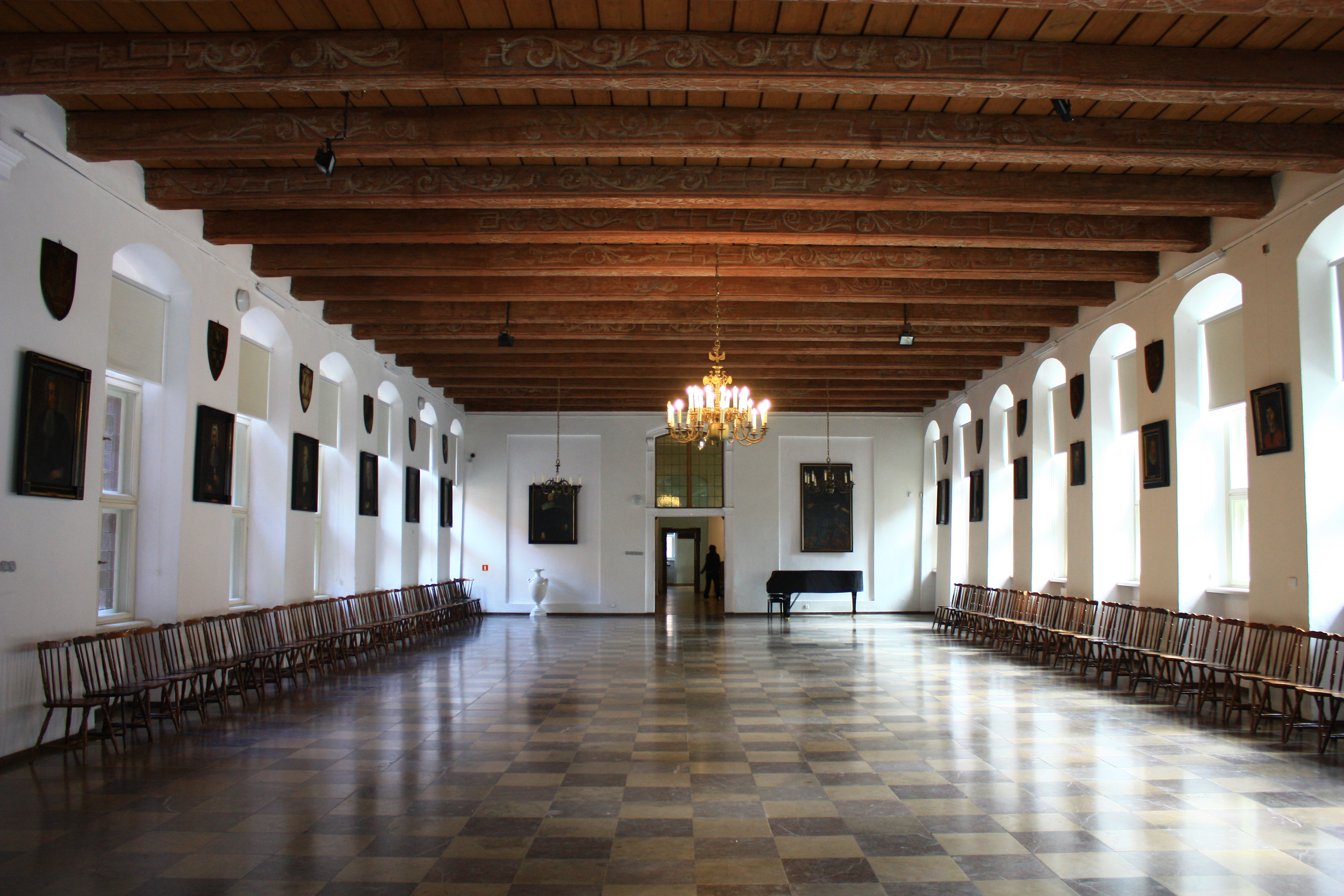
The Great Hall

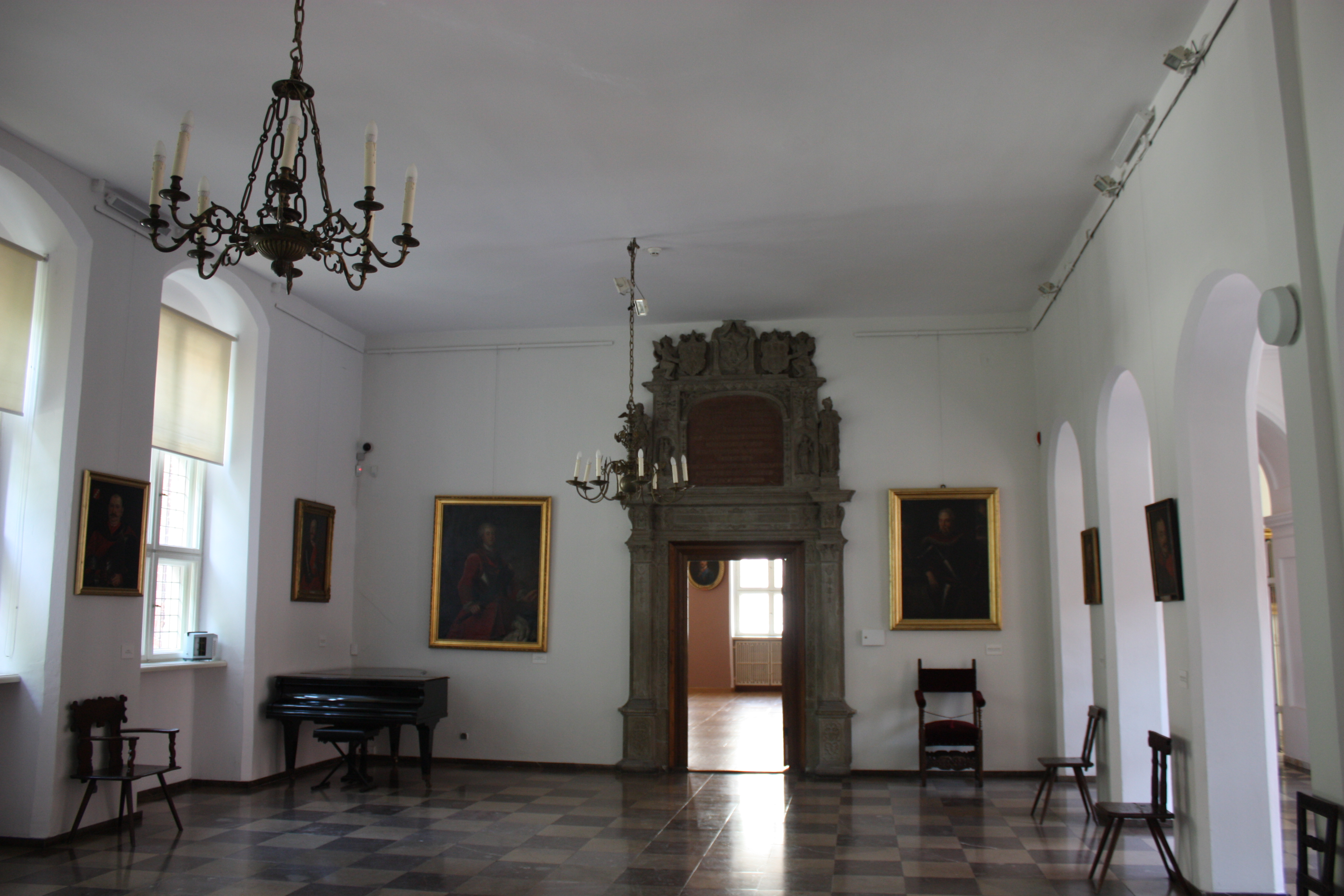
The lobby in front of the Royal Hall

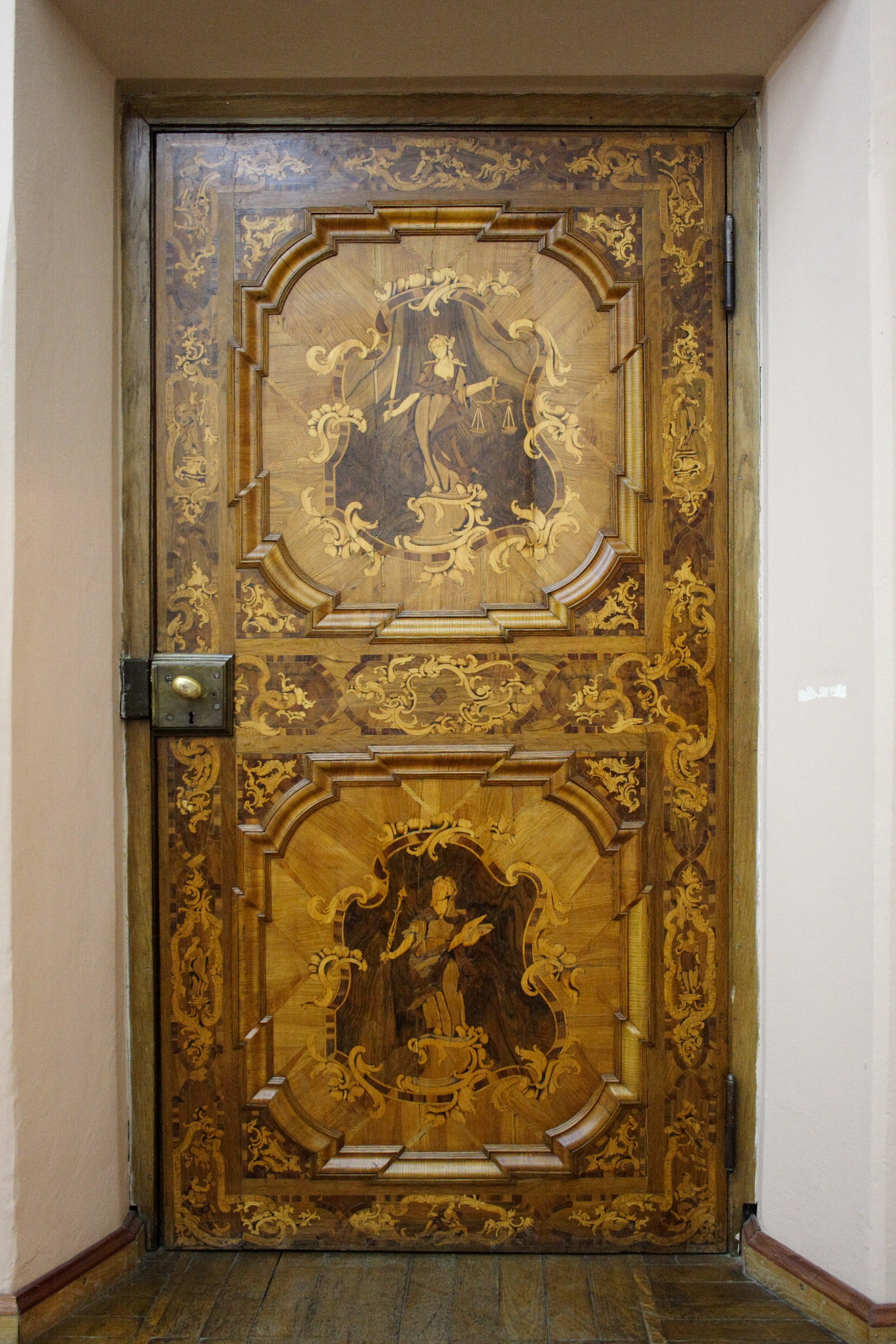
Rocococo doors to the Courtroom, made in 1760

== Exhibits ==
The city hall currently houses the main branch of the District Museum. Gothic and late-Gothic art collections, mainly from Toruń and Silesia (Brzeg, Wrocław), are gathered on the ground floor of the eastern wing. The most valuable collection of Gothic art galleries are fourteenth-century stained glass windows from the churches of Toruń and Chełmno. A collection of medieval and modern artistic craftsmanship of Toruń, including seventeenth and eighteenth century wooden gingerbread forms, as well as stone fragments of the decoration of the Teutonic castle are located in the western wing. The first floor serves mainly as a gallery of modern painting. The Council Hall houses a gallery of Toruń townsfolk portraits from the sixteenth to eighteenth century (portraits of Nicolaus Copernicus, Henryk Stroband, as well as those painted by Bartholomew Strobel), as well as paintings by Matejko, Witkacy, Krzyżanowski, Malczewski and Fałat, among others. The second floor is reserved for temporary exhibitions.

== Sources ==
- Gąsiorowski E., Ratusz Staromiejski w Toruniu, Toruń: Muzeum Okręgowe, 2004, ISBN 83-87083-78-X, OCLC 69476768.
