= Miastków Kościelny =

- Village
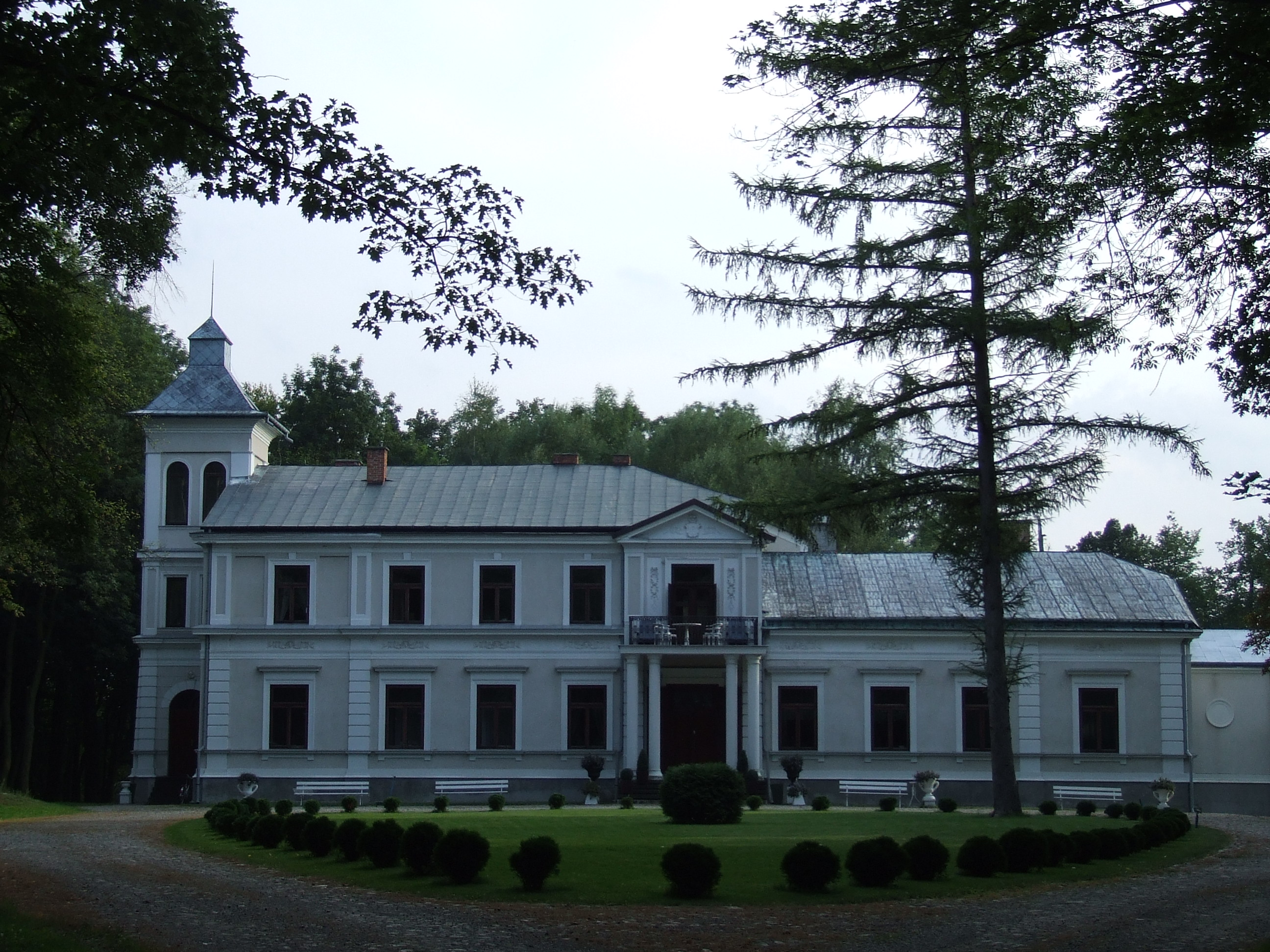
- Palace in Miastków Kościelny

- Location within Poland
- Coordinates: 51°54′N 21°50′E
- Country: Poland
- Voivodeship: Masovian
- County: Garwolin
- Gmina: Miastków Kościelny

Population
  - Total: 630
- Time zone: UTC+1 (CET)
  - Summer (DST): UTC+2 (CEST)
- Vehicle registration: WG

Miastków Kościelny [ˈmjastkuf kɔɕˈt͡ɕɛlnɨ] is a village in Garwolin County, Masovian Voivodeship, in east-central Poland. It is the seat of the gmina (administrative district) called Gmina Miastków Kościelny.

== Etymology ==
The name Miastków is an Old Polish diminutive of the word miasto, which means "town".

== History ==
Miastków Kościelny was granted Chełmno town rights in 1472, confirmed in 1482 and 1539, but in 1576 and 1660 it was again referred to as a village. It was owned successively owned by the Radzymiński, Prażmowski, Lasocki, Przebendowski, Bieliński, Radziwiłł, Bniński and Gąssowski noble families. It was devastated during the Swedish invasion of Poland in 1657.
