= Kruszówka =

- Village
- Location within Poland
- Coordinates: 51°54′59″N 21°52′26″E
- Country: Poland
- Voivodeship: Masovian
- County: Garwolin
- Gmina: Miastków Kościelny

Kruszówka [kruˈʂufka] is a village in the administrative district of Gmina Miastków Kościelny, within Garwolin County, Masovian Voivodeship, in east-central Poland.
