= Heinrich Stroband =

Polish activist

Heinrich Stroband (1548–1609) was a German protestant jurist and mayor of Toruń. He founded the Protestant Academic Gymnasium in Toruń, and was partially responsible for the codification of Kulm law in Toruń.

== Bibliography ==
- Janusz Małłek, Henryk Stroband (1548-1609). Reformator i współtwórca Gimnazjum Akademickiego w Toruniu, "Echa Przeszłości", T. XI, 2010, s. 63-68.
