= Zabruzdy =

- Village
- Location within Poland
- Coordinates: 51°54′25″N 21°51′40″E
- Country: Poland
- Voivodeship: Masovian
- County: Garwolin
- Gmina: Miastków Kościelny

Zabruzdy [zaˈbruzdɨ] is a village in the administrative district of Gmina Miastków Kościelny, within Garwolin County, Masovian Voivodeship, in east-central Poland.
