= Kujawy, Masovian Voivodeship =

Kujawy
- Village
- Location within Poland
- Coordinates: 51°54′39″N 21°49′57″E
- Country: Poland
- Voivodeship: Masovian
- County: Garwolin
- Gmina: Miastków Kościelny

Kujawy [kuˈjavɨ] is a village in the administrative district of Gmina Miastków Kościelny, within Garwolin County, Masovian Voivodeship, in east-central Poland.
