= Zgórze, Masovian Voivodeship =

Zgórze
- Village
- Location within Poland
- Coordinates: 51°53′15″N 21°45′36″E
- Country: Poland
- Voivodeship: Masovian
- County: Garwolin
- Gmina: Miastków Kościelny

Zgórze [ˈzɡuʐɛ] is a village in the administrative district of Gmina Miastków Kościelny, within Garwolin County, Masovian Voivodeship, in east-central Poland.
