= Glinki, Garwolin County =

Glinki
- Village
- Location within Poland
- Coordinates: 51°52′08″N 21°49′33″E
- Country: Poland
- Voivodeship: Masovian
- County: Garwolin
- Gmina: Miastków Kościelny

Glinki [ˈɡlinki] is a village in the administrative district of Gmina Miastków Kościelny, within Garwolin County, Masovian Voivodeship, in east-central Poland.
