= Brzegi, Masovian Voivodeship =

Brzegi
- Village
- Location within Poland
- Coordinates: 51°51′59″N 21°47′32″E
- Country: Poland
- Voivodeship: Masovian
- County: Garwolin
- Gmina: Miastków Kościelny

Brzegi [ˈbʐɛɡi] is a village in the administrative district of Gmina Miastków Kościelny, within Garwolin County, Masovian Voivodeship, in east-central Poland.
