= Przykory, Garwolin County =

Przykory
- Village
- Location within Poland
- Coordinates: 51°54′05″N 21°44′46″E
- Country: Poland
- Voivodeship: Masovian
- County: Garwolin
- Gmina: Miastków Kościelny

Przykory [pʂɨˈkɔrɨ] is a village in the administrative district of Gmina Miastków Kościelny, within Garwolin County, Masovian Voivodeship, in east-central Poland.
