= Narew, Podlaskie Voivodeship =

Narew
- Village
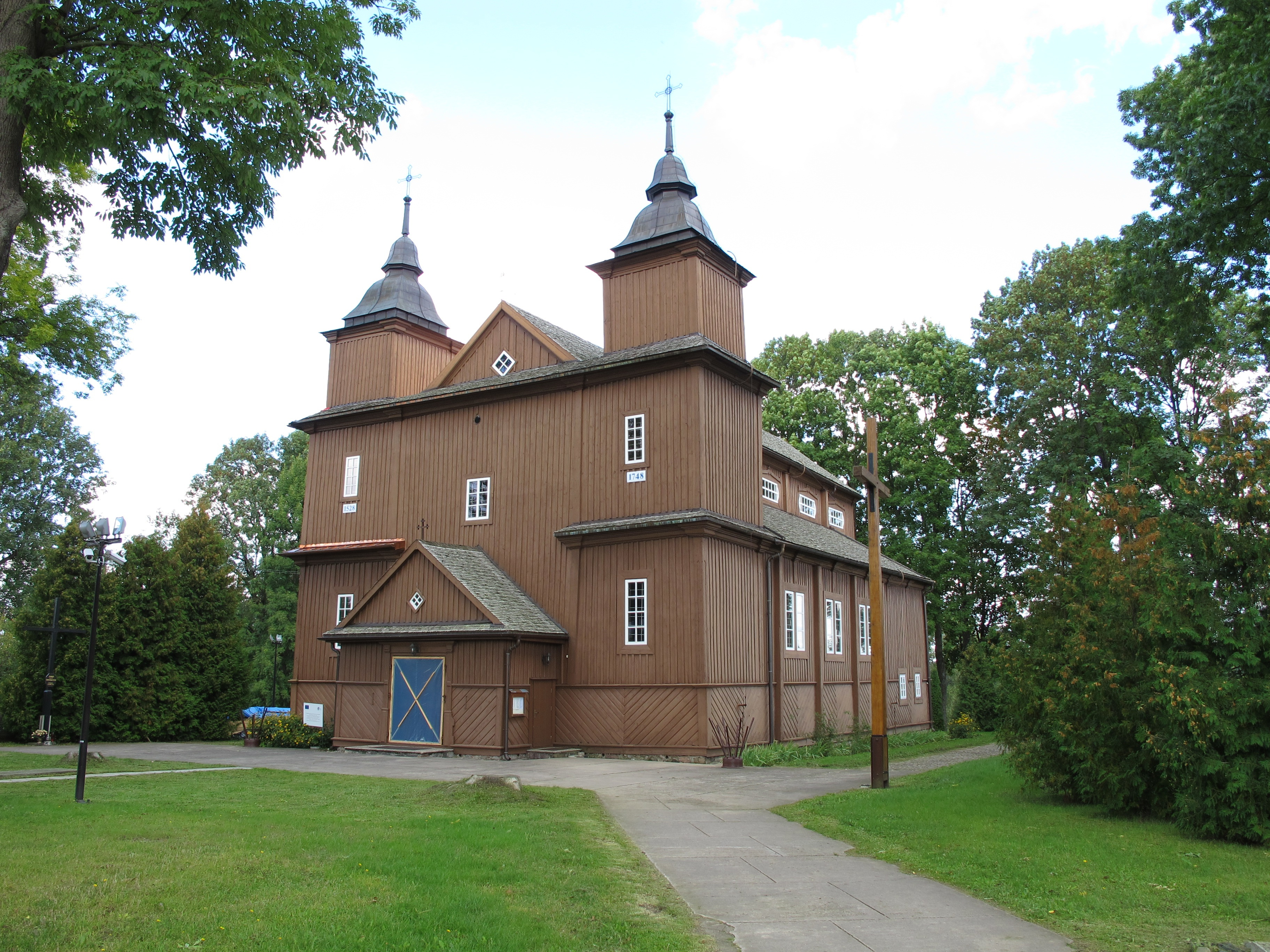
- Roman Catholic church

- Coat of arms

- Location within Poland
- Coordinates: 52°54′46″N 23°31′15″E
- Country: Poland
- Voivodeship: Podlaskie
- County: Hajnówka
- Gmina: Narew

Population
  - Total: 1,400
- Time zone: UTC+1 (CET)
  - Summer (DST): UTC+2 (CEST)

Narew [ˈnarɛf] is a village in Hajnówka County, Podlaskie Voivodeship, in north-eastern Poland. It is the seat of the gmina (administrative district) called Gmina Narew.

== History ==
Narew was founded in 1514. It was a royal town of Poland, administratively located in the Bielsk County in the Podlaskie Voivodeship in the Lesser Poland Province.

It lost its town status on May 24, 1934.

Following the German-Soviet invasion of Poland, which started World War II in September 1939, the town was occupied by the Soviet Union until 1941, and then by Nazi Germany until 1944. The Germans took local Jews out of the town and later killed them.

== Demography ==
The most spoken languages in Narew according to the Russian Imperial Census of 1897:

| Language | Population | Proportion |
|---|---|---|
| Yiddish | 601 | 41.91% |
| Ukrainian | 532 | 37.1% |
| Polish | 250 | 17.43% |
| Russian | 46 | 3.21% |
| Lithuanian | 3 | 0.21% |
| Belarusian | 1 | 0.07% |
| German | 1 | 0.07% |
| Total | 1,434 | 100.00% |

== See also ==
- Church of the Exaltation of the Holy Cross, Narew
