= Zwola Poduchowna =

- Village
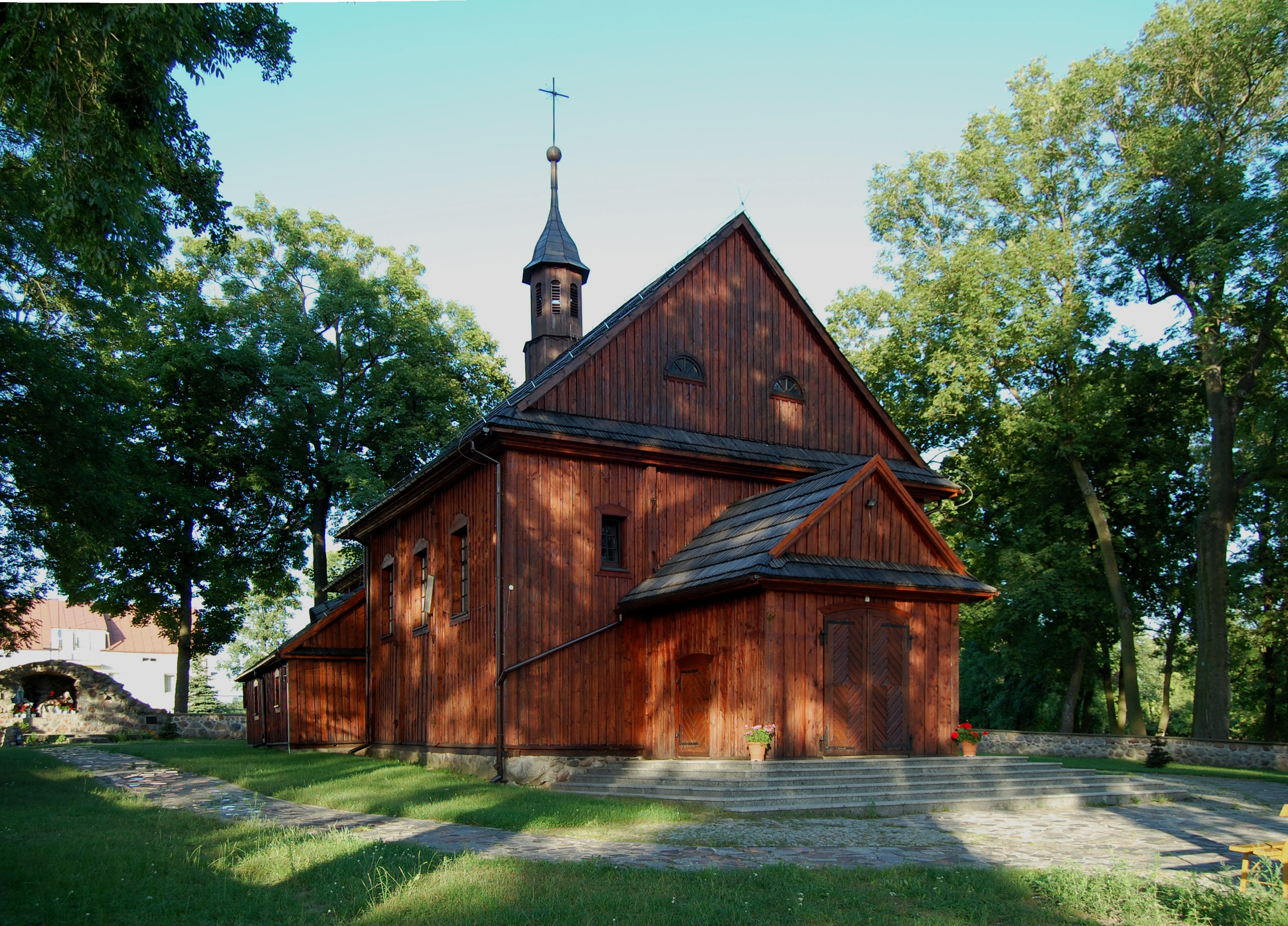
- church in Zwola Poduchowna

- Location within Poland
- Coordinates: 51°52′11″N 21°52′38″E
- Country: Poland
- Voivodeship: Masovian
- County: Garwolin
- Gmina: Miastków Kościelny
- Population: 266

Zwola Poduchowna [ˈzvɔla pɔduˈxɔvna] is a village in the administrative district of Gmina Miastków Kościelny, within Garwolin County, Masovian Voivodeship, in east-central Poland.
