= Zawada =

Zawada (from the Polish noun zawada, meaning "hindrance, encumbrance, obstacle, stumbling block", or similar) may refer to:

== People ==
- Zawada (surname)

== Places ==
- Zawada, Gostyń County in Greater Poland Voivodeship (west-central Poland)
- Zawada, Nowy Tomyśl County in Greater Poland Voivodeship (west-central Poland)
- Zawada, Gmina Łobżenica in Greater Poland Voivodeship (west-central Poland)
- Zawada, Gmina Szydłowo in Greater Poland Voivodeship (west-central Poland)
- Zawada, Bydgoszcz County in Kuyavian-Pomeranian Voivodeship (north-central Poland)
- Zawada, Gmina Pruszcz in Kuyavian-Pomeranian Voivodeship (north-central Poland)
- Zawada, Lubartów County in Lublin Voivodeship (east Poland)
- Zawada, Łęczyca County in Łódź Voivodeship (central Poland)
- Zawada, Poddębice County in Łódź Voivodeship (central Poland)
- Zawada, Gmina Tomaszów Mazowiecki in Łódź Voivodeship (central Poland)
- Zawada, Bochnia County in Lesser Poland Voivodeship (south Poland)
- Zawada, Myślenice County in Lesser Poland Voivodeship (south Poland)
- Zawada, Olkusz County in Lesser Poland Voivodeship (south Poland)
- Zawada, Tarnów County in Lesser Poland Voivodeship (south Poland)
- Zawada, Lower Silesian Voivodeship (south-west Poland)
- Zawada, Puławy County in Lublin Voivodeship (east Poland)
- Zawada, Zamość County in Lublin Voivodeship (east Poland)
- Zawada, Gmina Gubin, Krosno County in Lubusz Voivodeship (west Poland)
- Zawada, Nowa Sól County in Lubusz Voivodeship (west Poland)
- Zawada, Zielona Góra County in Lubusz Voivodeship (west Poland)
- Zawada, Masovian Voivodeship (east-central Poland)
- Zawada, Gmina Turawa, Opole County in Opole Voivodeship (south-west Poland)
- Zawada, Prudnik County in Opole Voivodeship (south-west Poland)
- Zawada, Subcarpathian Voivodeship (south-east Poland)
- Zawada, Chojnice County in Pomeranian Voivodeship (north Poland)
- Zawada, Człuchów County in Pomeranian Voivodeship (north Poland)
- Zawada, Słupsk County in Pomeranian Voivodeship (north Poland)
- Zawada, Starogard County in Pomeranian Voivodeship (north Poland)
- Zawada, Busko County in Świętokrzyskie Voivodeship (south-central Poland)
- Zawada, Kielce County in Świętokrzyskie Voivodeship (south-central Poland)
- Zawada, Opatów County in Świętokrzyskie Voivodeship (south-central Poland)
- Zawada, Staszów County in Świętokrzyskie Voivodeship (south-central Poland)
- Zawada, Będzin County in Silesian Voivodeship (south Poland)
- Zawada, Gmina Kamienica Polska in Silesian Voivodeship (south Poland)
- Zawada, Gmina Kłomnice in Silesian Voivodeship (south Poland)
- Zawada, Gmina Mstów in Silesian Voivodeship (south Poland)
- Zawada, Myszków County in Silesian Voivodeship (south Poland)
- Zawada, Tarnowskie Góry County in Silesian Voivodeship (south Poland)
- Zawada, Mrągowo County in Warmian-Masurian Voivodeship (north Poland)
- Zawada, Nowe Miasto County in Warmian-Masurian Voivodeship (north Poland)
- Zawada, Olsztyn County in Warmian-Masurian Voivodeship (north Poland)

== See also ==
- Zawada Książęca
- Zawada Lanckorońska
- Zawada Nowa
- Zawada Pilicka
- Zawada Stara
- Zawada Uszewska
- Kolonia Zawada
- Nowa Zawada
- Zawady (disambiguation)
- Zawadka (disambiguation)
- Zawadki (disambiguation)
- Zawadzki, a toponymic surname derived from one of the listed place names
