= Miechów (disambiguation) =

Miechów is a town in Lesser Poland Voivodeship, southern Poland.

Miechów may also refer to the following villages:

- Miechów, Lower Silesian Voivodeship (south-west Poland)
- Miechów, Lubusz Voivodeship (west Poland)
- Miechów, Masovian Voivodeship, (east-central Poland)

== See also ==
- Miechowo
- Miechów-Kolonia
