= Závada =

Závada may refer to:

== Places ==
=== Czech Republic ===
- Závada (Opava District), a municipality and village in the Moravian-Silesian Region
- Závada (Petrovice u Karviné), a village and part Petrovice u Karviné in the Moravian-Silesian Region

=== Slovakia ===
- Závada, Humenné District, a municipality and village in the Prešov Region
- Závada, Topoľčany District, a municipality and village in the Nitra Region
- Závada, Veľký Krtíš District, a municipality and village in the Banská Bystrica Region

== People ==
- Zavada (surname)

== See also ==
- Zawada (disambiguation), the Polish equivalent
