= Kroczów Większy =

- Village
- Location within Poland
- Coordinates: 51°17′N 21°30′E
- Country: Poland
- Voivodeship: Masovian
- County: Zwoleń
- Gmina: Kazanów

Kroczów Większy [ˈkrɔt͡ʂuf ˈvjɛnkʂɨ] is a village in the administrative district of Gmina Kazanów, within Zwoleń County, Masovian Voivodeship, in east-central Poland.
