= Patków, Zwoleń County =

Patków
- Village
- Location within Poland
- Coordinates: 51°27′N 21°35′E
- Country: Poland
- Voivodeship: Masovian
- County: Zwoleń
- Gmina: Policzna

Patków [ˈpatkuf] is a village in the administrative district of Gmina Policzna, within Zwoleń County, Masovian Voivodeship, in east-central Poland.
