= Kulczyn, Masovian Voivodeship =

Kulczyn
- Village
- Location within Poland
- Coordinates: 51°20′25″N 21°45′01″E
- Country: Poland
- Voivodeship: Masovian
- County: Zwoleń
- Gmina: Przyłęk

Kulczyn [ˈkult͡ʂɨn] is a village in the administrative district of Gmina Przyłęk, within Zwoleń County, Masovian Voivodeship, in east-central Poland.
