= Ruda, Gmina Przyłęk =

Ruda
- Village
- Location within Poland
- Coordinates: 51°18′12″N 21°41′23″E
- Country: Poland
- Voivodeship: Masovian
- County: Zwoleń
- Gmina: Przyłęk

Ruda [ˈruda] is a village in the administrative district of Gmina Przyłęk, within Zwoleń County, Masovian Voivodeship, in east-central Poland.
