= Melanów, Zwoleń County =

Village in Gmina Zwoleń, Poland

Melanów
- Village
- Location within Poland
- Coordinates: 51°20′08″N 21°32′08″E
- Country: Poland
- Voivodeship: Masovian
- County: Zwoleń
- Gmina: Zwoleń

Melanów [mɛˈlanuf] is a village in the administrative district of Gmina Zwoleń, within Zwoleń County, Masovian Voivodeship, in east-central Poland.
