= Helenów, Gmina Zwoleń =

Helenów
- Village
- Location within Poland
- Coordinates: 51°22′31″N 21°40′31″E
- Country: Poland
- Voivodeship: Masovian
- County: Zwoleń
- Gmina: Zwoleń
- Population: 50

Helenów [xɛˈlɛnuf] is a village in the administrative district of Gmina Zwoleń, within Zwoleń County, Masovian Voivodeship, in east-central Poland.
