= Lucin, Zwoleń County =

Lucin
- Village
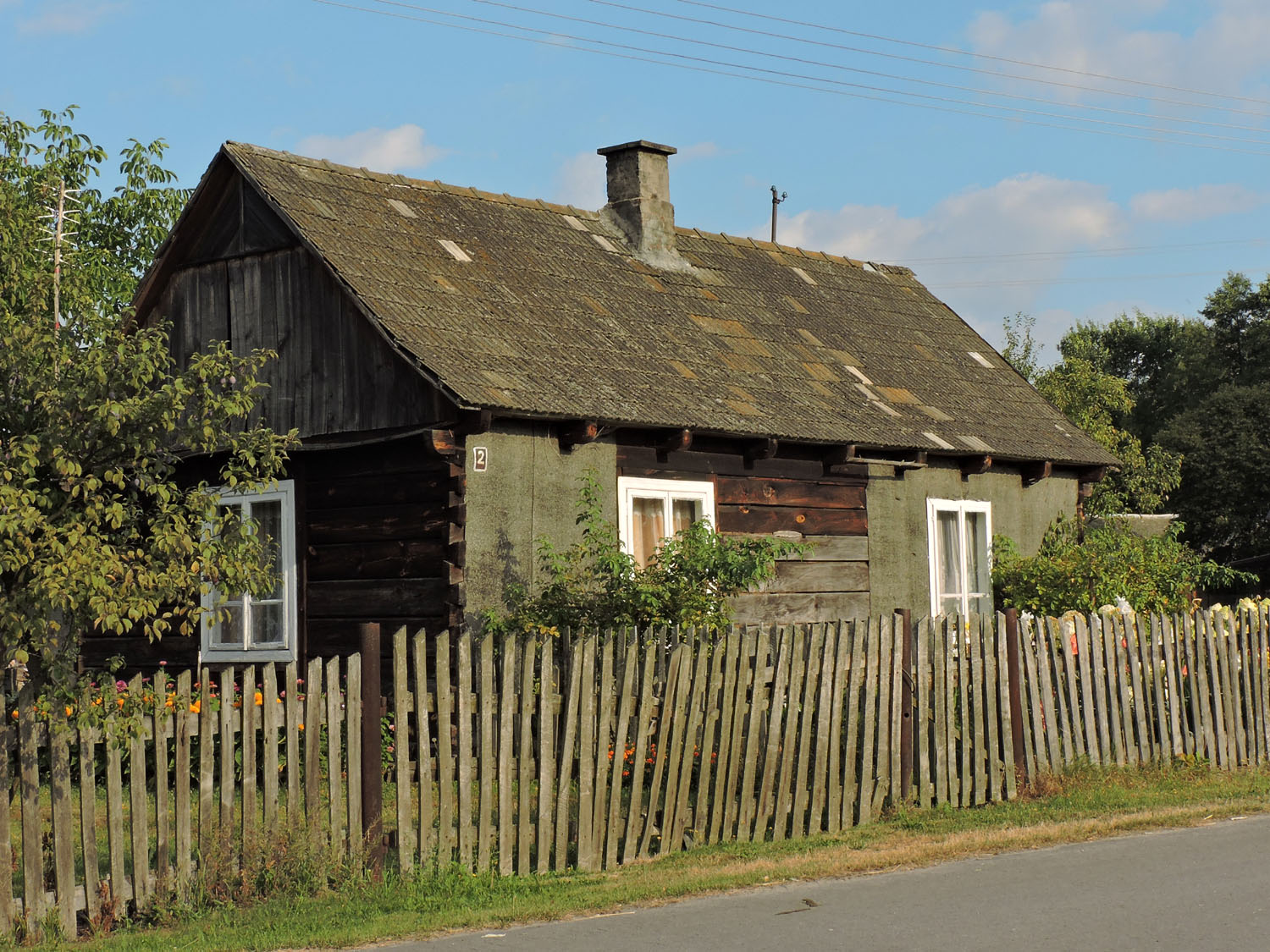

- Location within Poland
- Coordinates: 51°21′37″N 21°26′45″E
- Country: Poland
- Voivodeship: Masovian
- County: Zwoleń
- Gmina: Tczów

Lucin [ˈlut͡ɕin] is a village in the administrative district of Gmina Tczów, within Zwoleń County, Masovian Voivodeship, in east-central Poland.
