= Kolonia Chechelska =

- Village
- Location within Poland
- Coordinates: 51°23′22″N 21°43′33″E
- Country: Poland
- Voivodeship: Masovian
- County: Zwoleń
- Gmina: Policzna
- Population: 20

Kolonia Chechelska [kɔˈlɔɲa xɛˈxɛlska] is a village in the administrative district of Gmina Policzna, within Zwoleń County, Masovian Voivodeship, in east-central Poland.
