= Mieczysławów, Masovian Voivodeship =

Mieczysławów
- Village
- Location within Poland
- Coordinates: 51°23′N 21°40′E
- Country: Poland
- Voivodeship: Masovian
- County: Zwoleń
- Gmina: Zwoleń

Mieczysławów [mjɛt͡ʂɨˈswavuf] is a village in the administrative district of Gmina Zwoleń, within Zwoleń County, Masovian Voivodeship, in east-central Poland.
