= Niedarczów Górny-Wieś =

- Village
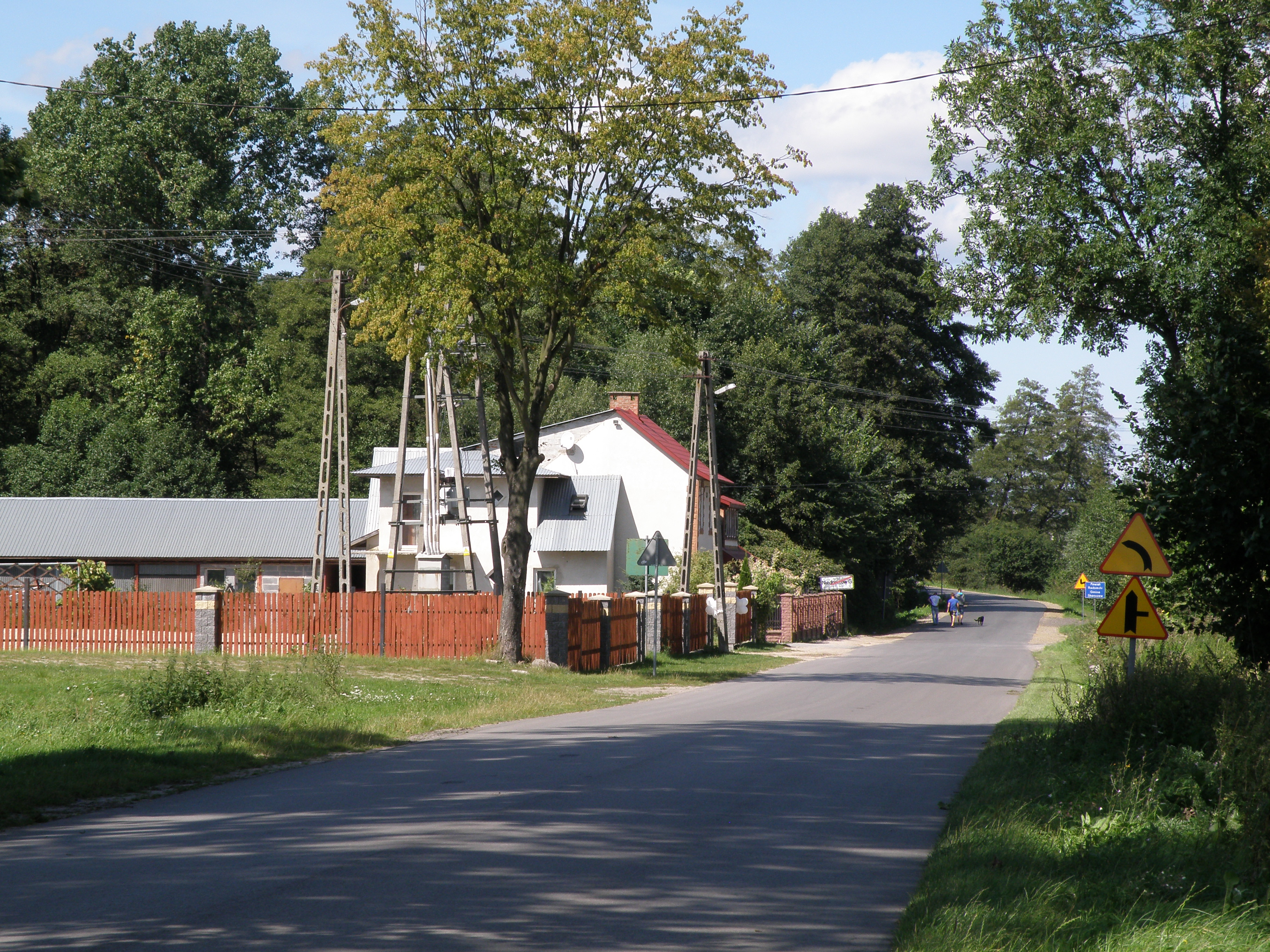

- Location within Poland
- Coordinates: 51°16′30″N 21°20′46″E
- Country: Poland
- Voivodeship: Masovian
- County: Zwoleń
- Gmina: Kazanów

Niedarczów Górny-Wieś [ɲɛˈdart͡ʂuf ˈɡurnɨ ˈvjɛɕ] is a village in the administrative district of Gmina Kazanów, within Zwoleń County, Masovian Voivodeship, in east-central Poland.
