= Piątków =

- Village
- Location within Poland
- Coordinates: 51°27′N 21°44′E
- Country: Poland
- Voivodeship: Masovian
- County: Zwoleń
- Gmina: Policzna
- Time zone: UTC+1 (CET)
  - Summer (DST): UTC+2 (CEST)

Piątków [ˈpjɔntkuf] is a village in the administrative district of Gmina Policzna, within Zwoleń County, Masovian Voivodeship, in east-central Poland.

Eight Polish citizens were murdered by Nazi Germany in the village during World War II.
