= Ignaców, Zwoleń County =

Ignaców
- Village
- Location within Poland
- Coordinates: 51°22′12″N 21°50′12″E
- Country: Poland
- Voivodeship: Masovian
- County: Zwoleń
- Gmina: Przyłęk

Ignaców [iɡˈnat͡suf] is a village in the administrative district of Gmina Przyłęk, within Zwoleń County, Masovian Voivodeship, in east-central Poland.
