= Podzakrzówek =

Village in Gmina Tczów, Poland

- Village
- Location within Poland
- Coordinates: 51°19′03″N 21°25′59″E
- Country: Poland
- Voivodeship: Masovian
- County: Zwoleń
- Gmina: Tczów

Podzakrzówek [pɔd͡zaˈkʂuvɛk] is a village in the administrative district of Gmina Tczów, within Zwoleń County, Masovian Voivodeship, in east-central Poland.
