= Borki, Zwoleń County =

Borki
- Village
- Location within Poland
- Coordinates: 51°20′54″N 21°26′34″E
- Country: Poland
- Voivodeship: Masovian
- County: Zwoleń
- Gmina: Tczów

Borki [ˈbɔrki] is a village in the administrative district of Gmina Tczów, within Zwoleń County, Masovian Voivodeship, in east-central Poland.
