= Helenów, Gmina Przyłęk =

Helenów
- Village
- Location within Poland
- Coordinates: 51°21′55″N 21°49′42″E
- Country: Poland
- Voivodeship: Masovian
- County: Zwoleń
- Gmina: Przyłęk
- Population: 110

Helenów [xɛˈlɛnuf] is a village in the administrative district of Gmina Przyłęk, within Zwoleń County, Masovian Voivodeship, in east-central Poland.
