= Rawica-Józefatka =

- Village
- Location within Poland
- Coordinates: 51°19′58″N 21°22′53″E
- Country: Poland
- Voivodeship: Masovian
- County: Zwoleń
- Gmina: Tczów

Rawica-Józefatka [raˈvit͡sa juzɛˈfatka] is a village in the administrative district of Gmina Tczów, within Zwoleń County, Masovian Voivodeship, in east-central Poland.
