= Wacławów, Zwoleń County =

Wacławów
- Village
- Location within Poland
- Coordinates: 51°17′45″N 21°33′26″E
- Country: Poland
- Voivodeship: Masovian
- County: Zwoleń
- Gmina: Zwoleń

Wacławów [vat͡sˈwavuf] is a village in the administrative district of Gmina Zwoleń, within Zwoleń County, Masovian Voivodeship, in east-central Poland.
