= Drozdów, Masovian Voivodeship =

Drozdów
- Village
- Location within Poland
- Coordinates: 51°17′29″N 21°35′23″E
- Country: Poland
- Voivodeship: Masovian
- County: Zwoleń
- Gmina: Zwoleń

Drozdów [ˈdrɔzduf] is a village in the administrative district of Gmina Zwoleń, within Zwoleń County, Masovian Voivodeship, in east-central Poland.
