= Rawica-Kolonia =

- Village
- Location within Poland
- Coordinates: 51°19′53″N 21°23′20″E
- Country: Poland
- Voivodeship: Masovian
- County: Zwoleń
- Gmina: Tczów

Rawica-Kolonia [raˈvit͡sa kɔˈlɔɲa] is a village in the administrative district of Gmina Tczów, within Zwoleń County, Masovian Voivodeship, in east-central Poland.
