= Józefów, Gmina Zwoleń =

Józefów
- Village
- Location within Poland
- Coordinates: 51°24′02″N 21°39′02″E
- Country: Poland
- Voivodeship: Masovian
- County: Zwoleń
- Gmina: Zwoleń

Józefów (Polish pronunciation: [juˈzɛfuf]) is a village in the administrative district of Gmina Zwoleń, within Zwoleń County, Masovian Voivodeship, in east-central Poland.
