= Cyganówka, Zwoleń County =

Cyganówka
- Village
- Location within Poland
- Coordinates: 51°21′43″N 21°37′49″E
- Country: Poland
- Voivodeship: Masovian
- County: Zwoleń
- Gmina: Zwoleń
- Population: 70

Cyganówka [t͡sɨɡaˈnufka] is a village in the administrative district of Gmina Zwoleń, within Zwoleń County, Masovian Voivodeship, in east-central Poland.
