= Wólka Gonciarska =

- Village
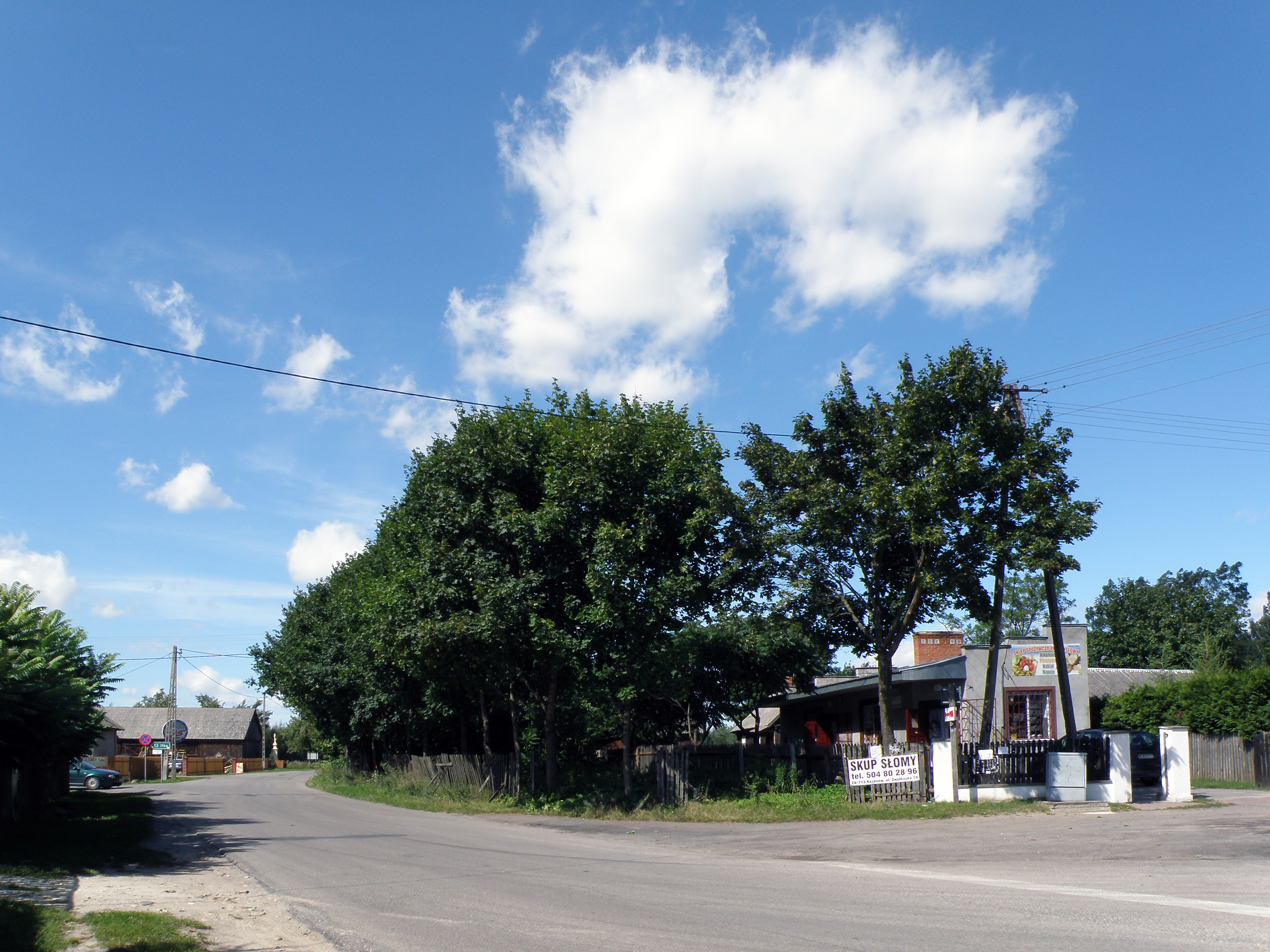
- Street of Wólka Gonciarska Village, Kazanów, Poland

- Location within Poland
- Coordinates: 51°14′12″N 21°22′23″E
- Country: Poland
- Voivodeship: Masovian
- County: Zwoleń
- Gmina: Kazanów

Wólka Gonciarska [ˈvulka ɡɔnˈt͡ɕarska] is a village in the administrative district of Gmina Kazanów, within Zwoleń County, Masovian Voivodeship, in east-central Poland.
