= Bożenczyzna =

- Village
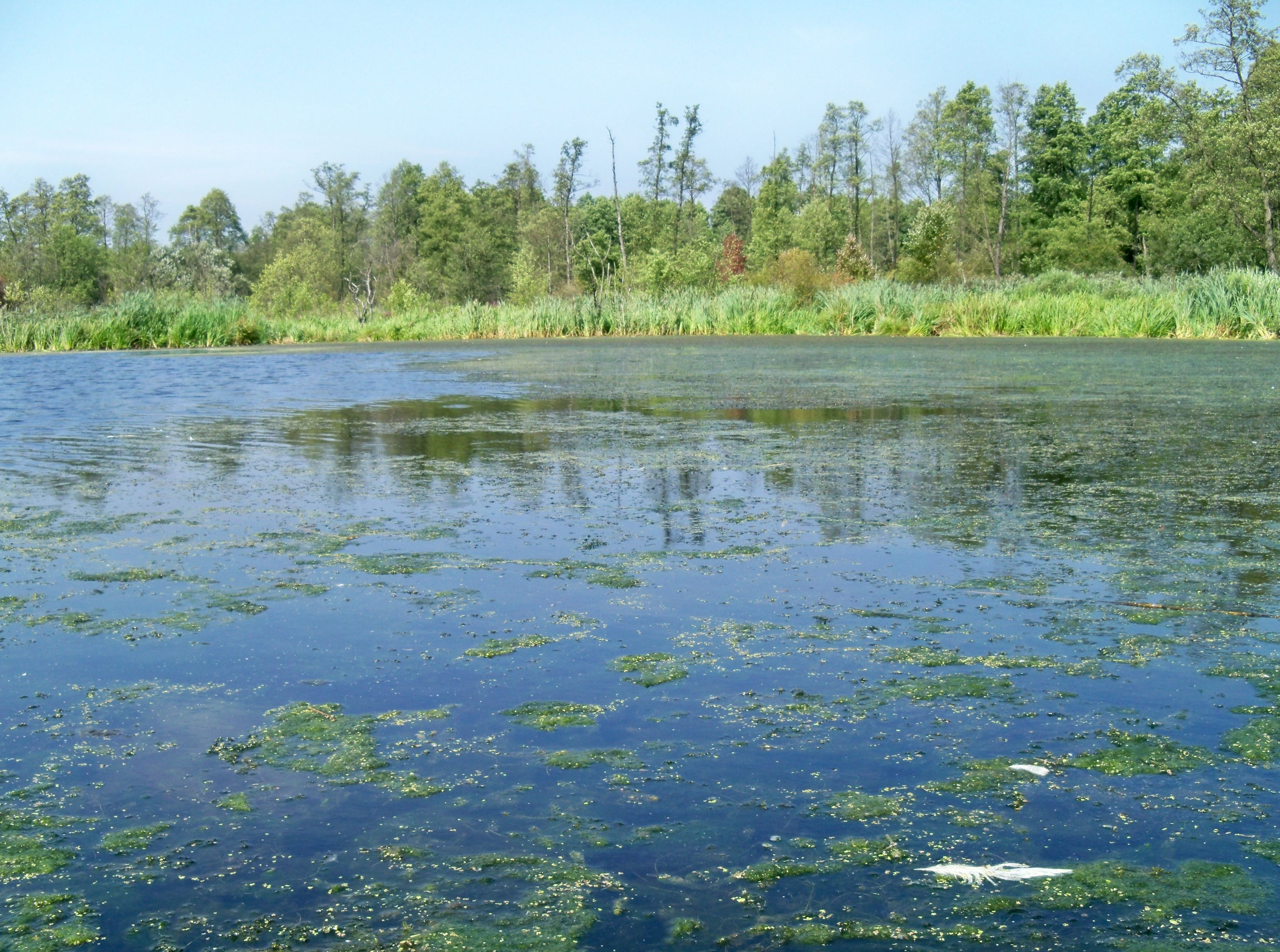

- Location within Poland
- Coordinates: 51°20′15″N 21°37′14″E
- Country: Poland
- Voivodeship: Masovian
- County: Zwoleń
- Gmina: Zwoleń

Bożenczyzna [bɔʐɛnˈt͡ʂɨzna] is a village in the administrative district of Gmina Zwoleń, within Zwoleń County, Masovian Voivodeship, in east-central Poland.
