= Szlachecki Las =

- Village
- Location within Poland
- Coordinates: 51°19′N 21°46′E
- Country: Poland
- Voivodeship: Masovian
- County: Zwoleń
- Gmina: Przyłęk

Szlachecki Las (Polish pronunciation: [ʂlaˈxɛtskʲi ˈlas]) is a village in the administrative district of Gmina Przyłęk, within Zwoleń County, Masovian Voivodeship, in east-central Poland.
