= Ostrownica-Kolonia =

- Village
- Location within Poland
- Coordinates: 51°13′49″N 21°26′55″E
- Country: Poland
- Voivodeship: Masovian
- County: Zwoleń
- Gmina: Kazanów

Ostrownica-Kolonia [ɔstrɔvˈnit͡sa kɔˈlɔɲa] is a village in the administrative district of Gmina Kazanów, within Zwoleń County, Masovian Voivodeship, in east-central Poland.
