= Wilczowola, Zwoleń County =

Wilczowola
- Village
- Location within Poland
- Coordinates: 51°26′N 21°37′E
- Country: Poland
- Voivodeship: Masovian
- County: Zwoleń
- Gmina: Policzna

Wilczowola [vilt͡ʂɔˈvɔla] is a village in the administrative district of Gmina Policzna, within Zwoleń County, Masovian Voivodeship, in east-central Poland.
