= Linów-Leśniczówka =

- Settlement
- Location within Poland
- Coordinates: 51°22′00″N 21°29′45″E
- Country: Poland
- Voivodeship: Masovian
- County: Zwoleń
- Gmina: Zwoleń

Linów-Leśniczówka (Polish pronunciation: [ˈlinuf lɛɕɲiˈtʂufka]) is a settlement in the administrative district of Gmina Zwoleń, within Zwoleń County, Masovian Voivodeship, in east-central Poland.
