= Zamość Nowy =

- Village
- Location within Poland
- Coordinates: 51°21′31″N 21°43′28″E
- Country: Poland
- Voivodeship: Masovian
- County: Zwoleń
- Gmina: Przyłęk

Zamość Nowy (Polish pronunciation: [ˈzamɔɕt͡ɕ ˈnɔvɨ]) is a village in the administrative district of Gmina Przyłęk, within Zwoleń County, Masovian Voivodeship, in east-central Poland.
