= Baryczka =

Baryczka refers to the following places in Poland:

- Baryczka, Masovian Voivodeship
- Baryczka, Podkarpackie Voivodeship
