= Ławeczko Nowe =

- Village
- Location within Poland
- Coordinates: 51°21′N 21°49′E
- Country: Poland
- Voivodeship: Masovian
- County: Zwoleń
- Gmina: Przyłęk

Ławeczko Nowe [waˈvɛt͡ʂkɔ ˈnɔvɛ] is a village in the administrative district of Gmina Przyłęk, within Zwoleń County, Masovian Voivodeship, in east-central Poland.
