= Kopiec, Masovian Voivodeship =

Kopiec
- Village
- Location within Poland
- Coordinates: 51°18′N 21°24′E
- Country: Poland
- Voivodeship: Masovian
- County: Zwoleń
- Gmina: Kazanów

Kopiec [ˈkɔpjɛt͡s] is a village in the administrative district of Gmina Kazanów, within Zwoleń County, Masovian Voivodeship, in east-central Poland.
