= Łagów, Masovian Voivodeship =

Łagów
- Village
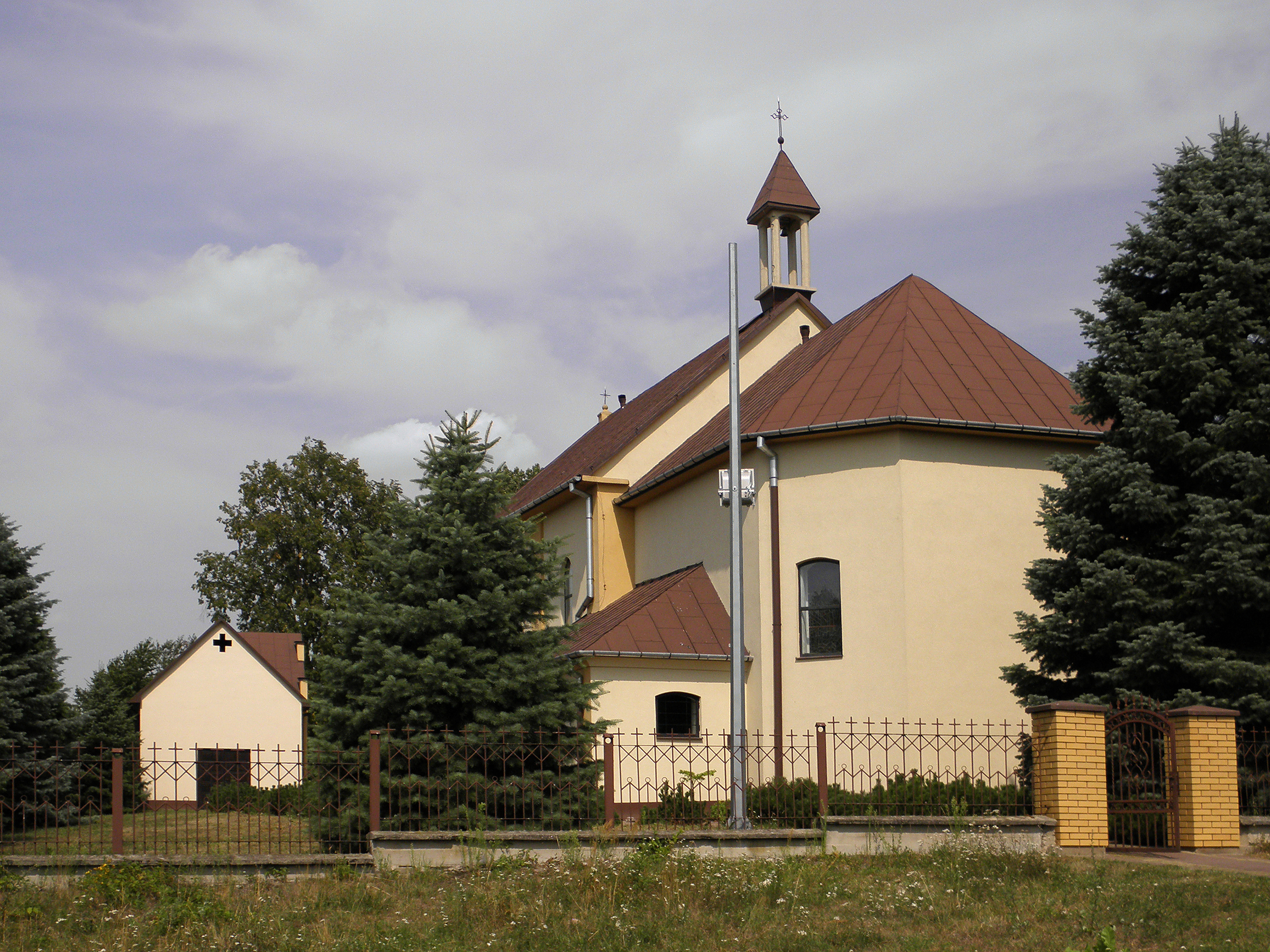
- Saint Florian church

- Location within Poland
- Coordinates: 51°22′N 21°46′E
- Country: Poland
- Voivodeship: Masovian
- County: Zwoleń
- Gmina: Przyłęk
- Time zone: UTC+1 (CET)
  - Summer (DST): UTC+2 (CEST)

Łagów [ˈwaɡuf] is a village in the administrative district of Gmina Przyłęk, within Zwoleń County, Masovian Voivodeship, in east-central Poland.

Nine Polish citizens were murdered by Nazi Germany in the village during World War II.
