= Niedarczów Dolny-Kolonia =

- Village
- Location within Poland
- Coordinates: 51°16′53″N 21°22′26″E
- Country: Poland
- Voivodeship: Masovian
- County: Zwoleń
- Gmina: Kazanów

Niedarczów Dolny-Kolonia [ɲɛˈdart͡ʂuf ˈdɔlnɨ kɔˈlɔɲa] is a village in the administrative district of Gmina Kazanów, within Zwoleń County, Masovian Voivodeship, in east-central Poland.
