= Świetlikowa Wola =

Village in Masovian Voivodeship, Poland

- Village
- Location within Poland
- Coordinates: 51°26′N 21°39′E
- Country: Poland
- Voivodeship: Masovian Voivodeship
- County: Zwoleń County
- Gmina: Gmina Policzna

Świetlikowa Wola (Polish pronunciation: [ɕfjɛtliˈkɔva ˈvɔla]) is a village in the administrative district of Gmina Policzna, within Zwoleń County, Masovian Voivodeship, in east-central Poland.
