= Dębniak, Masovian Voivodeship =

Dębniak
- Village
- Location within Poland
- Coordinates: 51°16′N 21°22′E
- Country: Poland
- Voivodeship: Masovian
- County: Zwoleń
- Gmina: Kazanów

Dębniak [ˈdɛmbɲak] is a village in the administrative district of Gmina Kazanów, within Zwoleń County, Masovian Voivodeship, in east-central Poland.
