= Osuchów, Zwoleń County =

Osuchów
- Village
- Location within Poland
- Coordinates: 51°18′N 21°26′E
- Country: Poland
- Voivodeship: Masovian
- County: Zwoleń
- Gmina: Kazanów

Osuchów [ɔˈsuxuf] is a village in the administrative district of Gmina Kazanów, within Zwoleń County, Masovian Voivodeship, in east-central Poland.
