= Annów, Masovian Voivodeship =

Annów
- Village
- Location within Poland
- Coordinates: 51°24′15″N 21°36′45″E
- Country: Poland
- Voivodeship: Masovian
- County: Zwoleń
- Gmina: Policzna
- Population: 90

Annów [ˈannuf] is a village in the administrative district of Gmina Policzna, within Zwoleń County, Masovian Voivodeship, in east-central Poland.
