= Jedlanka =

Jedlanka may refer to the following places:

- Jedlanka, Lublin Voivodeship (east Poland)
- Jedlanka, Radom County in Masovian Voivodeship (east-central Poland)
- Jedlanka, Zwoleń County in Masovian Voivodeship (east-central Poland)
