= Wincentów, Zwoleń County =

Wincentów
- Village
- Location within Poland
- Coordinates: 51°19′N 21°32′E
- Country: Poland
- Voivodeship: Masovian
- County: Zwoleń
- Gmina: Tczów

Wincentów [vinˈt͡sɛntuf] is a village in the administrative district of Gmina Tczów, within Zwoleń County, Masovian Voivodeship, in east-central Poland.
