= Sycyna-Kolonia =

- Village
- Location within Poland
- Coordinates: 51°18′21″N 21°35′28″E
- Country: Poland
- Voivodeship: Masovian
- County: Zwoleń
- Gmina: Zwoleń

Sycyna-Kolonia [sɨˈt͡sɨna kɔˈlɔɲa] is a village in the administrative district of Gmina Zwoleń, within Zwoleń County, Masovian Voivodeship, in east-central Poland.
