= Zielonka Nowa =

- Village
- Location within Poland
- Coordinates: 51°21′N 21°39′E
- Country: Poland
- Voivodeship: Masovian
- County: Zwoleń
- Gmina: Zwoleń

Zielonka Nowa [ʑɛˈlɔŋka ˈnɔva] is a village in the administrative district of Gmina Zwoleń, within Zwoleń County, Masovian Voivodeship, in east-central Poland.
