= Kopaniny, Masovian Voivodeship =

Kopaniny
- Village
- Location within Poland
- Coordinates: 51°19′50″N 21°32′16″E
- Country: Poland
- Voivodeship: Masovian
- County: Zwoleń
- Gmina: Zwoleń

Kopaniny [kɔpaˈninɨ] is a village in the administrative district of Gmina Zwoleń, within Zwoleń County, Masovian Voivodeship, in east-central Poland.
