= Miodne-Leśniczówka =

- Settlement
- Location within Poland
- Coordinates: 51°23′57″N 21°30′55″E
- Country: Poland
- Voivodeship: Masovian
- County: Zwoleń
- Gmina: Zwoleń

Miodne-Leśniczówka (Polish pronunciation: [ˈmjɔdnɛ lɛɕɲiˈtʂufka]) is a settlement in the administrative district of Gmina Zwoleń, within Zwoleń County, Masovian Voivodeship, in east-central Poland.
