= Barycz Nowa =

- Village
- Location within Poland
- Coordinates: 51°18′N 21°38′E
- Country: Poland
- Voivodeship: Masovian
- County: Zwoleń
- Gmina: Zwoleń
- Population: 317

Barycz Nowa [ˈbarɨt͡ʂ ˈnɔva] is a village in the administrative district of Gmina Zwoleń, within Zwoleń County, Masovian Voivodeship, in east-central Poland.
