= Pałki, Masovian Voivodeship =

Village in Gmina Zwoleń, Poland

Pałki
- Village
- Location within Poland
- Coordinates: 51°20′28″N 21°32′35″E
- Country: Poland
- Voivodeship: Masovian
- County: Zwoleń
- Gmina: Zwoleń

Pałki [ˈpau̯ki] is a village in the administrative district of Gmina Zwoleń, within Zwoleń County, Masovian Voivodeship, in east-central Poland.
