= Tynica =

- Village
- Location within Poland
- Coordinates: 51°20′N 21°23′E
- Country: Poland
- Voivodeship: Masovian
- County: Zwoleń
- Gmina: Tczów

Tynica [tɨˈnit͡sa] is a village in the administrative district of Gmina Tczów, within Zwoleń County, Masovian Voivodeship, in east-central Poland.
