= Lipiny, Zwoleń County =

Lipiny
- Village
- Location within Poland
- Coordinates: 51°18′42″N 21°43′56″E
- Country: Poland
- Voivodeship: Masovian
- County: Zwoleń
- Gmina: Przyłęk

Lipiny [liˈpinɨ] is a village in the administrative district of Gmina Przyłęk, within Zwoleń County, Masovian Voivodeship, in east-central Poland.
