= Szczęście, Masovian Voivodeship =

Szczęście
- Village
- Location within Poland
- Coordinates: 51°21′48″N 21°40′12″E
- Country: Poland
- Voivodeship: Masovian
- County: Zwoleń
- Gmina: Zwoleń
- Population: 110

Szczęście ([ˈʂt͡ʂɛ̃ɕt͡ɕɛ]) is a village in the administrative district of Gmina Zwoleń, within Zwoleń County, Masovian Voivodeship, in east-central Poland.
