= Celestynów, Zwoleń County =

Celestynów
- Village
- Location within Poland
- Coordinates: 51°22′1″N 21°41′44″E
- Country: Poland
- Voivodeship: Masovian
- Gmina: Zwoleń
- Population: 60

Celestynów [t͡sɛlɛsˈtɨnuf] is a village in the administrative district of Gmina Zwoleń, within Zwoleń County, Masovian Voivodeship, in east-central Poland.
