= Sosnowice, Masovian Voivodeship =

Sosnowice
- Village
- Location within Poland
- Coordinates: 51°19′28″N 21°33′08″E
- Country: Poland
- Voivodeship: Masovian
- County: Zwoleń
- Gmina: Zwoleń

Sosnowice [sɔsnɔˈvit͡sɛ] is a village in the administrative district of Gmina Zwoleń, within Zwoleń County, Masovian Voivodeship, in east-central Poland.
