= Zastocze, Masovian Voivodeship =

Zastocze
- Village
- Location within Poland
- Coordinates: 51°18′4″N 21°39′47″E
- Country: Poland
- Voivodeship: Masovian
- County: Zwoleń
- Gmina: Zwoleń

Zastocze [zasˈtɔt͡ʂɛ] is a village in the administrative district of Gmina Zwoleń, within Zwoleń County, Masovian Voivodeship, in east-central Poland.
