= Ostrowy, Zwoleń County =

Ostrowy
- Village
- Location within Poland
- Coordinates: 51°21′21″N 21°32′8″E
- Country: Poland
- Voivodeship: Masovian
- County: Zwoleń
- Gmina: Zwoleń
- Population: 40

Ostrowy [ɔsˈtrɔvɨ] is a village in the administrative district of Gmina Zwoleń, within Zwoleń County, Masovian Voivodeship, in east-central Poland.
