= Atalin =

- Village
- Location within Poland
- Coordinates: 51°21′N 21°36′E
- Country: Poland
- Voivodeship: Masovian
- County: Zwoleń
- Gmina: Zwoleń

Atalin [aˈtalin] is a village in the administrative district of Gmina Zwoleń, within Zwoleń County, Masovian Voivodeship, in east-central Poland. It consists of a housing block, a creamery, and various private houses. There used to be a small convenience store next to the housing block however, it was abandoned around 2019. A small logistics company started using the courtyard of one of the homes as their trucking hub around 2022 and later bought the plot of land on the other side of the road in order to expand. Heading in the direction of Lublin the village is split into two by the road, resulting in a partition into two parts. The right parts has been described above, the left part is described below. A daycare, a roofing shop, a few farm plots, a few more houses and a field road heading back to Zwoleń. While there isn't a lot in Atalin, it still remains as one of the many calm villages located right next to a bigger town across Poland, serving as additional living space for those who can afford the commute and want their own property.
