= Mszadla Dolna =

- Village
- Location within Poland
- Coordinates: 51°20′11″N 21°46′41″E
- Country: Poland
- Voivodeship: Masovian
- County: Zwoleń
- Gmina: Przyłęk

Mszadla Dolna [ˈmʂadla ˈdɔlna] is a village in the administrative district of Gmina Przyłęk, within Zwoleń County, Masovian Voivodeship, in east-central Poland.
