= Mszadla Stara =

- Village
- Location within Poland
- Coordinates: 51°21′09″N 21°45′58″E
- Country: Poland
- Voivodeship: Masovian
- County: Zwoleń
- Gmina: Przyłęk

Mszadla Stara [ˈmʂadla ˈstara] is a village in the administrative district of Gmina Przyłęk, within Zwoleń County, Masovian Voivodeship, in east-central Poland.
