= Jasieniec-Kolonia =

- Village
- Location within Poland
- Coordinates: 51°16′57″N 21°38′55″E
- Country: Poland
- Voivodeship: Masovian
- County: Zwoleń
- Gmina: Zwoleń

Jasieniec-Kolonia [jaˈɕɛɲɛt͡s kɔˈlɔɲa] is a village in the administrative district of Gmina Zwoleń, within Zwoleń County, Masovian Voivodeship, in east-central Poland.
