= Sycyna Południowa =

- Village
- Location within Poland
- Coordinates: 51°18′14″N 21°36′22″E
- Country: Poland
- Voivodeship: Masovian
- County: Zwoleń
- Gmina: Zwoleń

Sycyna Południowa [sɨˈt͡sɨna pɔwudˈɲɔva] is a village in the administrative district of Gmina Zwoleń, within Zwoleń County, Masovian Voivodeship, in east-central Poland.
