= Misztal =

Misztal is a Polish surname, and it may refer to:

- Franciszek Misztal (1901, in Lisie Jamy – 1981), a Polish aeronautical engineer
- Henryk Misztal (born 1936, in Skubicha), Polish priest and professor
- Bronisław Misztal (born 1946), Polish sociologist, professor of the Warsaw University
- Genowefa Misztal (1950, in Męciszów – 2006), Polish professor of pharmaceutical sciences at the Medical University of Lublin
- Stanisław Misztal (born 1953, in Hrubieszów), Polish politician, doctor, deputy to the Polish Parliament
- Piotr Misztal (born 1965, in Łódź), a Polish businessman and politician
- Piotr Misztal (born 1987, [?]), a Polish footballer

== Miśtal ==
- Grzegorz Miśtal (born 1973, Kraków), Polish movie-, TV- and theater actor
