= Miodne-Gajówka =

- Settlement
- Location within Poland
- Coordinates: 51°24′13″N 21°33′58″E
- Country: Poland
- Voivodeship: Masovian
- County: Zwoleń
- Gmina: Zwoleń

Miodne-Gajówka [ˈmjɔdnɛ ɡaˈjufka] is a settlement in the administrative district of Gmina Zwoleń, within Zwoleń County, Masovian Voivodeship, in east-central Poland.
