= Wojciechówka, Zwoleń County =

Wojciechówka
- Village
- Location within Poland
- Coordinates: 51°24′47″N 21°36′39″E
- Country: Poland
- Voivodeship: Masovian
- County: Zwoleń
- Gmina: Policzna

Wojciechówka (Polish pronunciation: [vɔjt͡ɕɛˈxufka]) is a village in the administrative district of Gmina Policzna, within Zwoleń County, Masovian Voivodeship, in east-central Poland.
