= Rawica Stara =

- Village
- Location within Poland
- Coordinates: 51°19′N 21°24′E
- Country: Poland
- Voivodeship: Masovian
- County: Zwoleń
- Gmina: Tczów
- Population: 457

Rawica Stara [raˈvit͡sa ˈstara] is a village in the administrative district of Gmina Tczów, within Zwoleń County, Masovian Voivodeship, in east-central Poland.
