= Bartodzieje, Zwoleń County =

Bartodzieje
- Village
- Location within Poland
- Coordinates: 51°21′N 21°30′E
- Country: Poland
- Voivodeship: Masovian
- County: Zwoleń
- Gmina: Tczów

Bartodzieje [bartɔˈd͡ʑɛjɛ] is a village in the administrative district of Gmina Tczów, within Zwoleń County, Masovian Voivodeship, in east-central Poland.
