= Podlinówek =

Village in Gmina Zwoleń, Poland

- Village
- Location within Poland
- Coordinates: 51°22′21″N 21°31′16″E
- Country: Poland
- Voivodeship: Masovian
- County: Zwoleń
- Gmina: Zwoleń

Podlinówek [pɔdliˈnuvɛk] is a village in the administrative district of Gmina Zwoleń, within Zwoleń County, Masovian Voivodeship, in east-central Poland.
