= Zakrzówek-Kolonia =

- Village
- Location within Poland
- Coordinates: 51°18′09″N 21°23′56″E
- Country: Poland
- Voivodeship: Masovian
- County: Zwoleń
- Gmina: Kazanów

Zakrzówek-Kolonia [zaˈkʂuvɛk kɔˈlɔɲa] is a village in the administrative district of Gmina Kazanów, within Zwoleń County, Masovian Voivodeship, in east-central Poland.
