= Krzywda, Zwoleń County =

Krzywda
- Village
- Location within Poland
- Coordinates: 51°19′N 21°44′E
- Country: Poland
- Voivodeship: Masovian
- County: Zwoleń
- Gmina: Przyłęk

Krzywda [ˈkʂɨvda] is a village in the administrative district of Gmina Przyłęk, within Zwoleń County, Masovian Voivodeship, in east-central Poland.
