= Grabów nad Wisłą =

- Village
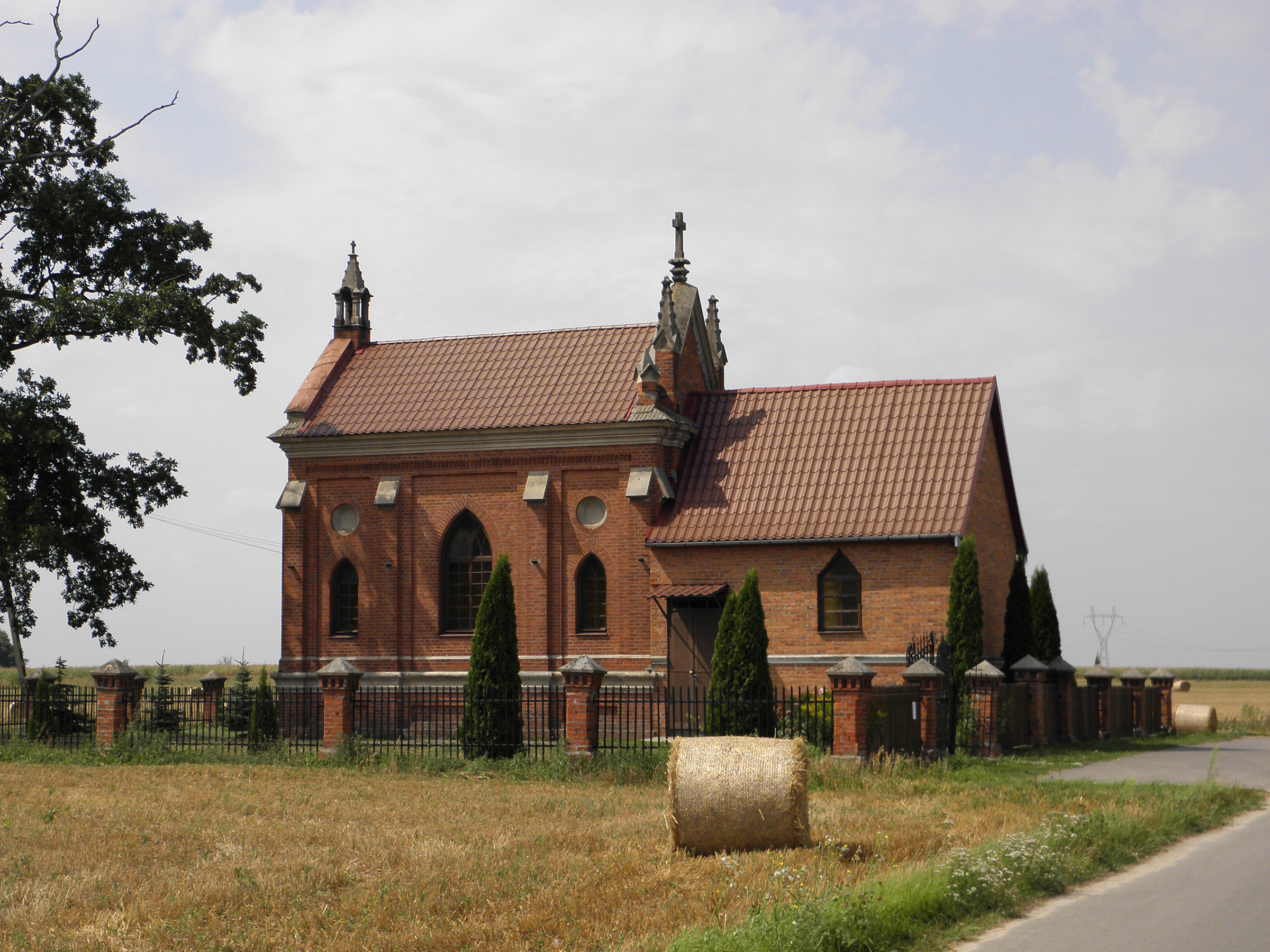
- Saint Sophia church

- Location within Poland
- Coordinates: 51°21′18″N 21°40′09″E
- Country: Poland
- Voivodeship: Masovian
- County: Zwoleń
- Gmina: Przyłęk

Grabów nad Wisłą [ˈɡrabuf ˌnad ˈviswɔ̃] is a village in the administrative district of Gmina Przyłęk, within Zwoleń County, Masovian Voivodeship, in east-central Poland.
