= Niedarczów Dolny-Wieś =

Village in Gmina Kazanów, Poland

- Village
- Location within Poland
- Coordinates: 51°16′20″N 21°23′36″E
- Country: Poland
- Voivodeship: Masovian
- County: Zwoleń
- Gmina: Kazanów

Niedarczów Dolny-Wieś [ɲɛˈdart͡ʂuf ˈdɔlnɨ ˈvjɛɕ] is a village in the administrative district of Gmina Kazanów, within Zwoleń County, Masovian Voivodeship, in east-central Poland.
