= Stefanów, Zwoleń County =

Stefanów
- Village
- Location within Poland
- Coordinates: 51°19′42″N 21°41′18″E
- Country: Poland
- Voivodeship: Masovian
- County: Zwoleń
- Gmina: Przyłęk

Stefanów [stɛˈfanuf] is a village in the administrative district of Gmina Przyłęk, within Zwoleń County, Masovian Voivodeship, in east-central Poland.
