= Janów, Zwoleń County =

Janów
- Village
- Location within Poland
- Coordinates: 51°22′N 21°30′E
- Country: Poland
- Voivodeship: Masovian
- County: Zwoleń
- Gmina: Tczów

Janów [ˈjanuf] is a village in the administrative district of Gmina Tczów, within Zwoleń County, Masovian Voivodeship, in east-central Poland.
