= Ostrówka =

- Village
- Location within Poland
- Coordinates: 51°16′N 21°27′E
- Country: Poland
- Voivodeship: Masovian
- County: Zwoleń
- Gmina: Kazanów

Ostrówka [ɔsˈtrufka] is a village in the administrative district of Gmina Kazanów, within Zwoleń County, Masovian Voivodeship, in east-central Poland.
