= Helenówka, Masovian Voivodeship =

Helenówka
- Village
- Location within Poland
- Coordinates: 51°24′13″N 21°35′48″E
- Country: Poland
- Voivodeship: Masovian
- County: Zwoleń
- Gmina: Zwoleń

Helenówka [xɛlɛˈnufka] is a village in the administrative district of Gmina Zwoleń, within Zwoleń County, Masovian Voivodeship, in east-central Poland.
