= Zakrzówek, Zwoleń County =

Zakrzówek
- Village
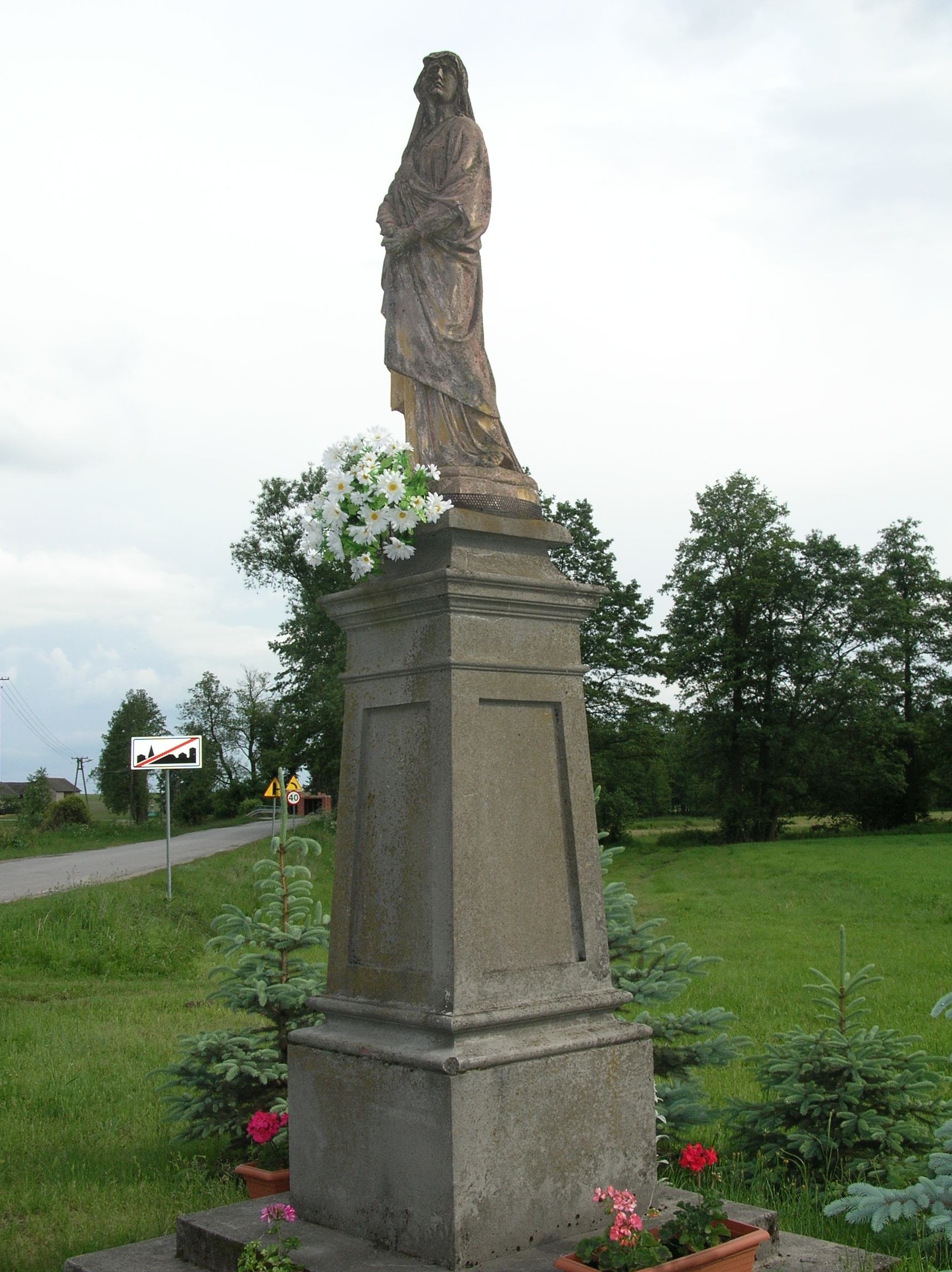
- Statue in Zakrzówek

- Location within Poland
- Coordinates: 51°17′35″N 21°22′12″E
- Country: Poland
- Voivodeship: Masovian
- County: Zwoleń
- Gmina: Kazanów
- Population: 290

Zakrzówek [zaˈkʂuvɛk] is a village in the administrative district of Gmina Kazanów, within Zwoleń County, Masovian Voivodeship, in east-central Poland.
