= Rawica Nowa =

- Village
- Location within Poland
- Coordinates: 51°21′N 21°24′E
- Country: Poland
- Voivodeship: Masovian
- County: Zwoleń
- Gmina: Tczów
- Population: 93

Rawica Nowa [raˈvit͡sa ˈnɔva] is a village in the administrative district of Gmina Tczów, within Zwoleń County, Masovian Voivodeship, in east-central Poland.
