= Wacławów-Gajówka =

- Village
- Location within Poland
- Coordinates: 51°18′12″N 21°33′38″E
- Country: Poland
- Voivodeship: Masovian
- County: Zwoleń
- Gmina: Zwoleń

Wacławów-Gajówka [vat͡sˈwavuf ɡaˈjufka] is a village in the administrative district of Gmina Zwoleń, within Zwoleń County, Masovian Voivodeship, in east-central Poland.
