= Niwki, Masovian Voivodeship =

Niwki
- Village
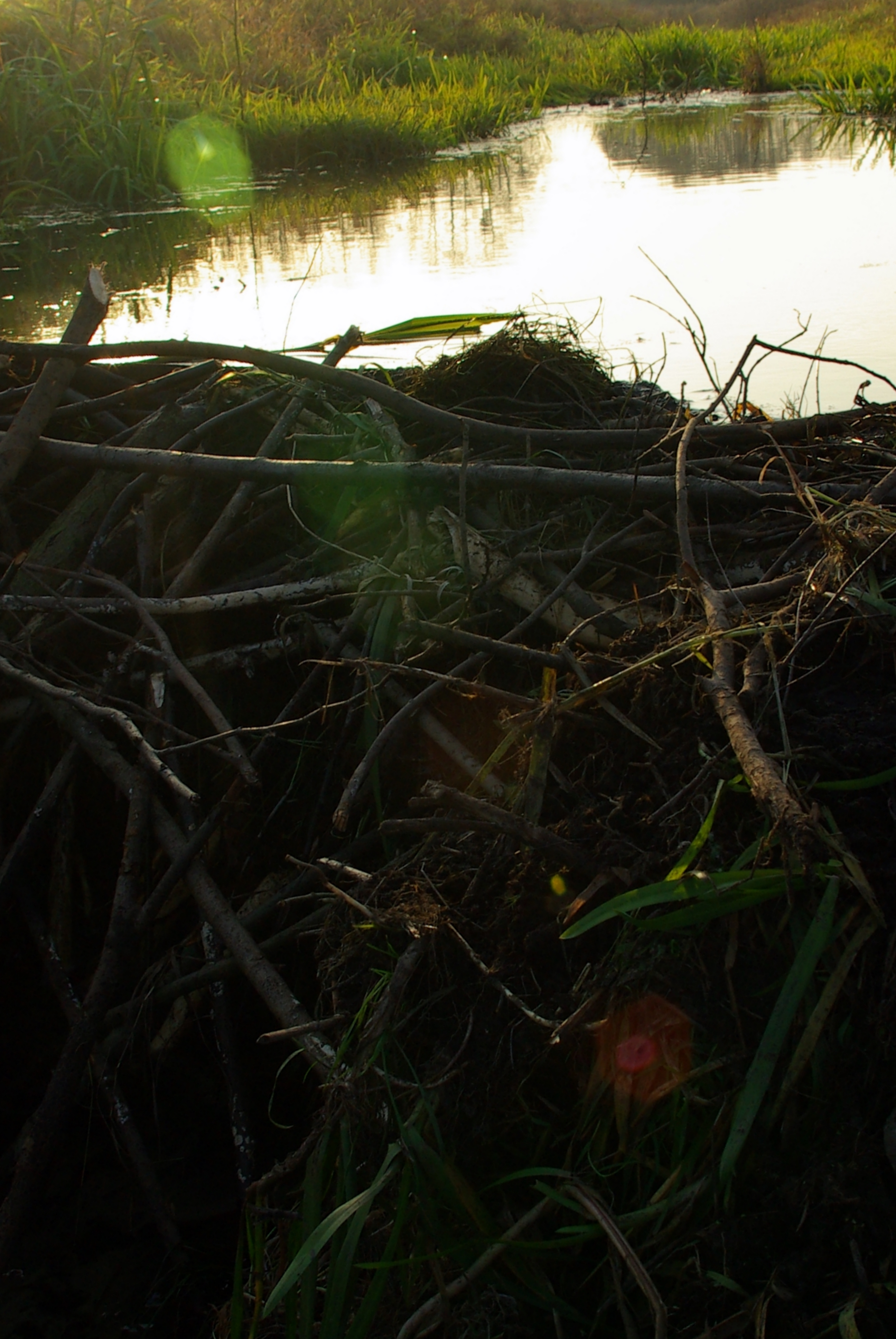

- Location within Poland
- Coordinates: 51°22′51″N 21°22′04″E
- Country: Poland
- Voivodeship: Masovian
- County: Zwoleń
- Gmina: Zwoleń

Niwki [ˈnifki] is a village in the administrative district of Gmina Zwoleń, within Zwoleń County, Masovian Voivodeship, in east-central Poland.
