= Michalin, Zwoleń County =

Michalin
- Village
- Location within Poland
- Coordinates: 51°22′15″N 21°40′2″E
- Country: Poland
- Voivodeship: Masovian
- County: Zwoleń
- Gmina: Zwoleń
- Population: 110

Michalin [miˈxalin] is a village in the administrative district of Gmina Zwoleń, within Zwoleń County, Masovian Voivodeship, in east-central Poland.
