= Babin, Masovian Voivodeship =

Babin
- Village
- Location within Poland
- Coordinates: 51°20′N 21°43′E
- Country: Poland
- Voivodeship: Masovian
- County: Zwoleń
- Gmina: Przyłęk

Babin [ˈbabin] is a village in the administrative district of Gmina Przyłęk, within Zwoleń County, Masovian Voivodeship, in east-central Poland.
