= Stanisławów, Zwoleń County =

Stanisławów
- Village
- Location within Poland
- Coordinates: 51°26′15″N 21°39′15″E
- Country: Poland
- Voivodeship: Masovian
- County: Zwoleń
- Gmina: Policzna

Stanisławów [staniˈswavuf] is a village in the administrative district of Gmina Policzna, within Zwoleń County, Masovian Voivodeship, in east-central Poland.
