= Paciorkowa Wola Stara =

- Village
- Location within Poland
- Coordinates: 51°23′11″N 21°37′35″E
- Country: Poland
- Voivodeship: Masovian
- County: Zwoleń
- Gmina: Zwoleń

Paciorkowa Wola Stara [pat͡ɕɔrˈkɔva ˈvɔla ˈstara] is a village in the administrative district of Gmina Zwoleń, within Zwoleń County, Masovian Voivodeship, in east-central Poland.
