= Ruda, Gmina Kazanów =

Ruda
- Village
- Location within Poland
- Coordinates: 51°15′37″N 21°23′54″E
- Country: Poland
- Voivodeship: Masovian
- County: Zwoleń
- Gmina: Kazanów

Ruda [ˈruda] is a village in the administrative district of Gmina Kazanów, within Zwoleń County, Masovian Voivodeship, in east-central Poland.
