= Józefów, Gmina Tczów =

Józefów
- Village
- Location within Poland
- Coordinates: 51°20′59″N 21°30′45″E
- Country: Poland
- Voivodeship: Masovian
- County: Zwoleń
- Gmina: Tczów

Józefów (Polish pronunciation: [juˈzɛfuf]) is a village in the administrative district of Gmina Tczów, within Zwoleń County, Masovian Voivodeship, in east-central Poland.
