= Kazimierzów, Zwoleń County =

Kazimierzów
- Village
- Location within Poland
- Coordinates: 51°20′22″N 21°24′50″E
- Country: Poland
- Voivodeship: Masovian
- County: Zwoleń
- Gmina: Tczów

Kazimierzów [kaʑiˈmjɛʐuf] is a village in the administrative district of Gmina Tczów, within Zwoleń County, Masovian Voivodeship, in east-central Poland.
