= Niedarczów Górny-Kolonia =

- Village
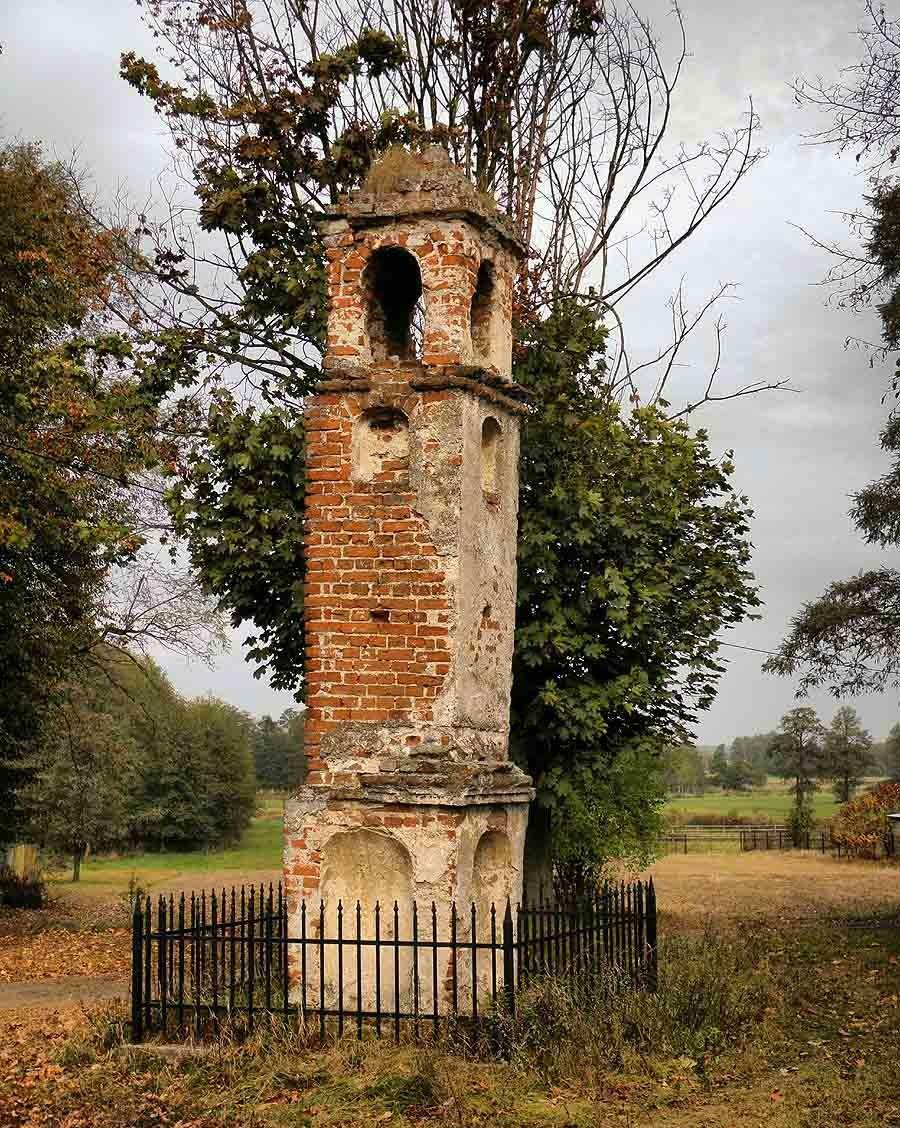
- A roadside historic pillar shrine in Niedarczów Górny-Kolonia

- Location within Poland
- Coordinates: 51°16′43″N 21°11′11″E
- Country: Poland
- Voivodeship: Masovian
- County: Zwoleń
- Gmina: Kazanów

Niedarczów Górny-Kolonia [ɲɛˈdart͡ʂuf ˈɡurnɨ kɔˈlɔɲa] is a village in the administrative district of Gmina Kazanów, within Zwoleń County, Masovian Voivodeship, in east-central Poland.
