= Mostki, Masovian Voivodeship =

Mostki
- Village
- Location within Poland
- Coordinates: 51°20′47″N 21°32′21″E
- Country: Poland
- Voivodeship: Masovian
- County: Zwoleń
- Gmina: Zwoleń
- Population: 220

Mostki [ˈmɔstki] is a village in the administrative district of Gmina Zwoleń, within Zwoleń County, Masovian Voivodeship, in east-central Poland.
