= Zawada Stara =

- Village
- Location within Poland
- Coordinates: 51°29′N 21°43′E
- Country: Poland
- Voivodeship: Masovian
- County: Zwoleń
- Gmina: Policzna

Zawada Stara [zaˈvada ˈstara] is a village in the administrative district of Gmina Policzna, within Zwoleń County, Masovian Voivodeship, in east-central Poland.
