= Gmina Tczów =

Gmina Tczów Tczów Commune
- Gmina
- Flag Coat of arms
- Interactive map of Gmina Tczów
- Coordinates (Tczów): 51°20′N 21°28′E
- Country: Poland
- Voivodeship: Masovian
- County: Zwoleń
- Seat: Tczów

Area
  - Total: 72.12 km^{2} (27.85 sq mi)

Population (2006)
  - Total: 4,877
  - Density: 67.62/km^{2} (175.1/sq mi)
- Website: http://www.tczow.pl

Gmina Tczów is a rural gmina (administrative district) in Zwoleń County, Masovian Voivodeship, in east-central Poland. Its seat is the village of Tczów, which lies approximately 9 kilometres (6 mi) west of Zwoleń and 104 km (65 mi) south of Warsaw.

The gmina covers an area of 72.12 square kilometres (27.8 sq mi), and as of 2006 its total population is 4,877.

== Villages ==
Gmina Tczów contains the villages and settlements of Bartodzieje, Borki, Brzezinki Nowe, Brzezinki Stare, Janów, Józefów, Julianów, Kazimierzów, Lucin, Podzakrzówek, Rawica Nowa, Rawica Stara, Rawica-Józefatka, Rawica-Kolonia, Tczów, Tynica and Wincentów.

== Neighbouring gminas ==
Gmina Tczów is bordered by the gminas of Gózd, Kazanów, Skaryszew and Zwoleń.
