= Policzna, Masovian Voivodeship =

Policzna
- Village
- Location within Poland
- Coordinates: 51°27′N 21°38′E
- Country: Poland
- Voivodeship: Masovian
- County: Zwoleń
- Gmina: Policzna
- Population: 1,500

Policzna [pɔˈlit͡ʂna] is a village in Zwoleń County, Masovian Voivodeship, in east-central Poland. It is the seat of the gmina (administrative district) called Gmina Policzna.
