= Baryczka, Masovian Voivodeship =

Baryczka
- Village
- Location within Poland
- Coordinates: 51°19′3″N 21°48′57″E
- Country: Poland
- Voivodeship: Masovian
- County: Zwoleń
- Gmina: Przyłęk

Baryczka [baˈrɨt͡ʂka] is a village in the administrative district of Gmina Przyłęk, within Zwoleń County, Masovian Voivodeship, in east-central Poland.
