= Miechów-Kolonia =

Village in Gmina Kazanów, Poland

- Village
- Location within Poland
- Coordinates: 51°16′26″N 21°26′36″E
- Country: Poland
- Voivodeship: Masovian
- County: Zwoleń
- Gmina: Kazanów

Miechów-Kolonia [ˈmjɛxuf kɔˈlɔɲa] is a village in the administrative district of Gmina Kazanów, within Zwoleń County, Masovian Voivodeship, in east-central Poland.
