= Gmina Zwoleń =

Gmina Zwoleń Zwoleń Commune
- Gmina
- Coat of arms
- Interactive map of Gmina Zwoleń
- Coordinates (Zwoleń): 51°21′25″N 21°35′2″E
- Country: Poland
- Voivodeship: Masovian
- County: Zwoleń
- Seat: Zwoleń

Area
  - Total: 161.12 km^{2} (62.21 sq mi)

Population (2006)
  - Total: 15,233
  - Density: 94.544/km^{2} (244.87/sq mi)
  - Urban: 8,176
  - Rural: 7,057
- Website: http://www.zwolen.pl

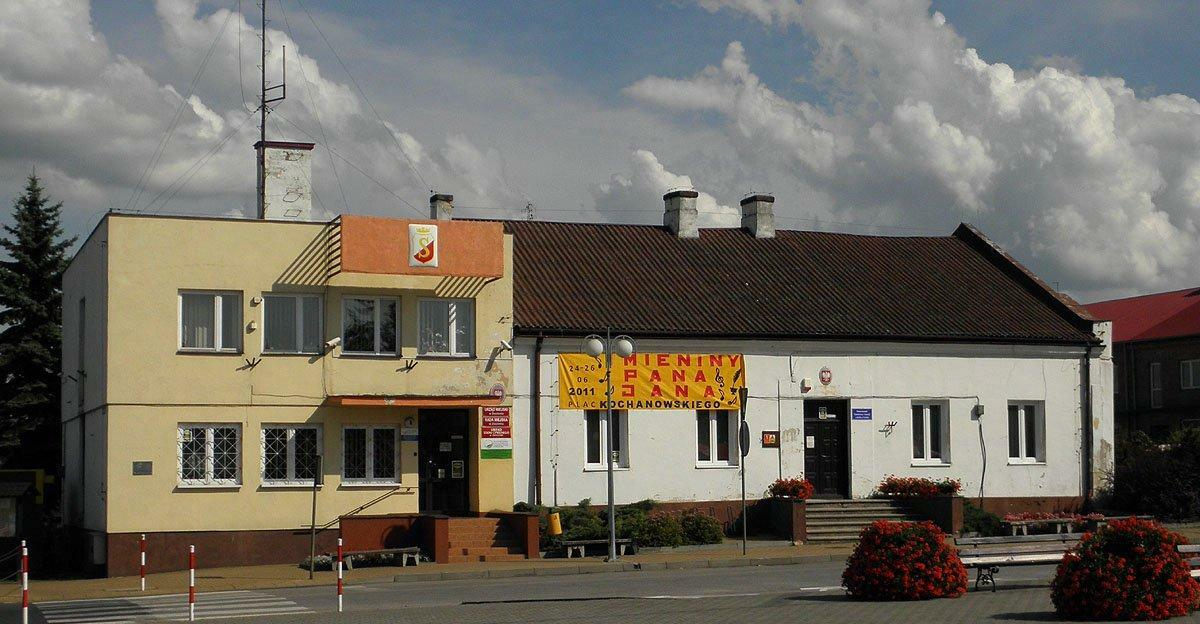
Zwoleń, Town Hall - fotopolska

Gmina Zwoleń is an urban-rural gmina (administrative district) in Zwoleń County, Masovian Voivodeship, in east-central Poland. Its seat is the town of Zwoleń, which lies approximately 104 kilometres (65 mi) south-east of Warsaw.

The gmina covers an area of 161.12 square kilometres (62.2 sq mi), and as of 2006 its total population is 15,233 (out of which the population of Zwoleń amounts to 8,176, and the population of the rural part of the gmina is 7,057).

== Villages ==
Apart from the town of Zwoleń, Gmina Zwoleń contains the villages and settlements of Atalin, Barycz Nowa, Barycz Stara, Barycz-Kolonia, Bożenczyzna, Celestynów, Cyganówka, Drozdów, Filipinów, Helenów, Helenówka, Jasieniec Solecki, Jasieniec-Kolonia, Jedlanka, Józefów, Karczówka, Karolin, Kopaniny, Koszary, Linów, Linów-Leśniczówka, Ługi, Męciszów, Melanów, Michalin, Mieczysławów, Miodne-Gajówka, Miodne-Leśniczówka, Mostki, Motorzyny-Leśniczówka, Niwki, Osiny, Ostrowy, Paciorkowa Wola Nowa, Paciorkowa Wola Stara, Pałki, Podlinówek, Podzagajnik, Sosnowice, Strykowice Błotne, Strykowice Górne, Strykowice Podleśne, Sycyna Północna, Sycyna Południowa, Sycyna-Kolonia, Sydół, Szczęście, Wacławów, Wacławów-Gajówka, Wólka Szelężna, Zastocze, Zielonka Nowa and Zielonka Stara.

== Neighbouring gminas ==
Gmina Zwoleń is bordered by the gminas of Chotcza, Ciepielów, Gózd, Kazanów, Pionki, Policzna, Przyłęk and Tczów.
