= Gmina Przyłęk =

Gmina Przyłęk Przyłęk Commune
- Gmina
- Coat of arms
- Interactive map of Gmina Przyłęk
- Coordinates (Przyłęk): 51°20′N 21°45′E
- Country: Poland
- Voivodeship: Masovian
- County: Zwoleń
- Seat: Przyłęk

Area
  - Total: 130.89 km^{2} (50.54 sq mi)

Population (2006)
  - Total: 6,479
  - Density: 49.50/km^{2} (128.2/sq mi)
- Website: http://www.przylek.pl/

Gmina Przyłęk is a rural gmina (administrative district) in Zwoleń County, Masovian Voivodeship, in east-central Poland. Its seat is the village of Przyłęk, which lies approximately 12 kilometres (7 mi) south-east of Zwoleń and 114 km (71 mi) south-east of Warsaw.

The gmina covers an area of 130.89 square kilometres (50.5 sq mi), and as of 2006 its total population is 6,479.

== Villages ==
Gmina Przyłęk contains the villages and settlements of Andrzejów, Babin, Baryczka, Grabów nad Wisłą, Helenów, Ignaców, Krzywda, Kulczyn, Łagów, Łaguszów, Ławeczko Nowe, Ławeczko Stare, Lipiny, Lucimia, Mierziączka, Mszadla Dolna, Mszadla Nowa, Mszadla Stara, Okrężnica, Pająków, Przyłęk, Ruda, Rudki, Stefanów, Szlachecki Las, Wólka Łagowska, Wólka Zamojska, Wysocin, Załazy, Zamość Nowy and Zamość Stary.

== Neighbouring gminas ==
Gmina Przyłęk is bordered by the gminas of Chotcza, Janowiec, Policzna, Puławy, Wilków and Zwoleń.
