= Kazanów, Masovian Voivodeship =

Kazanów
- Town
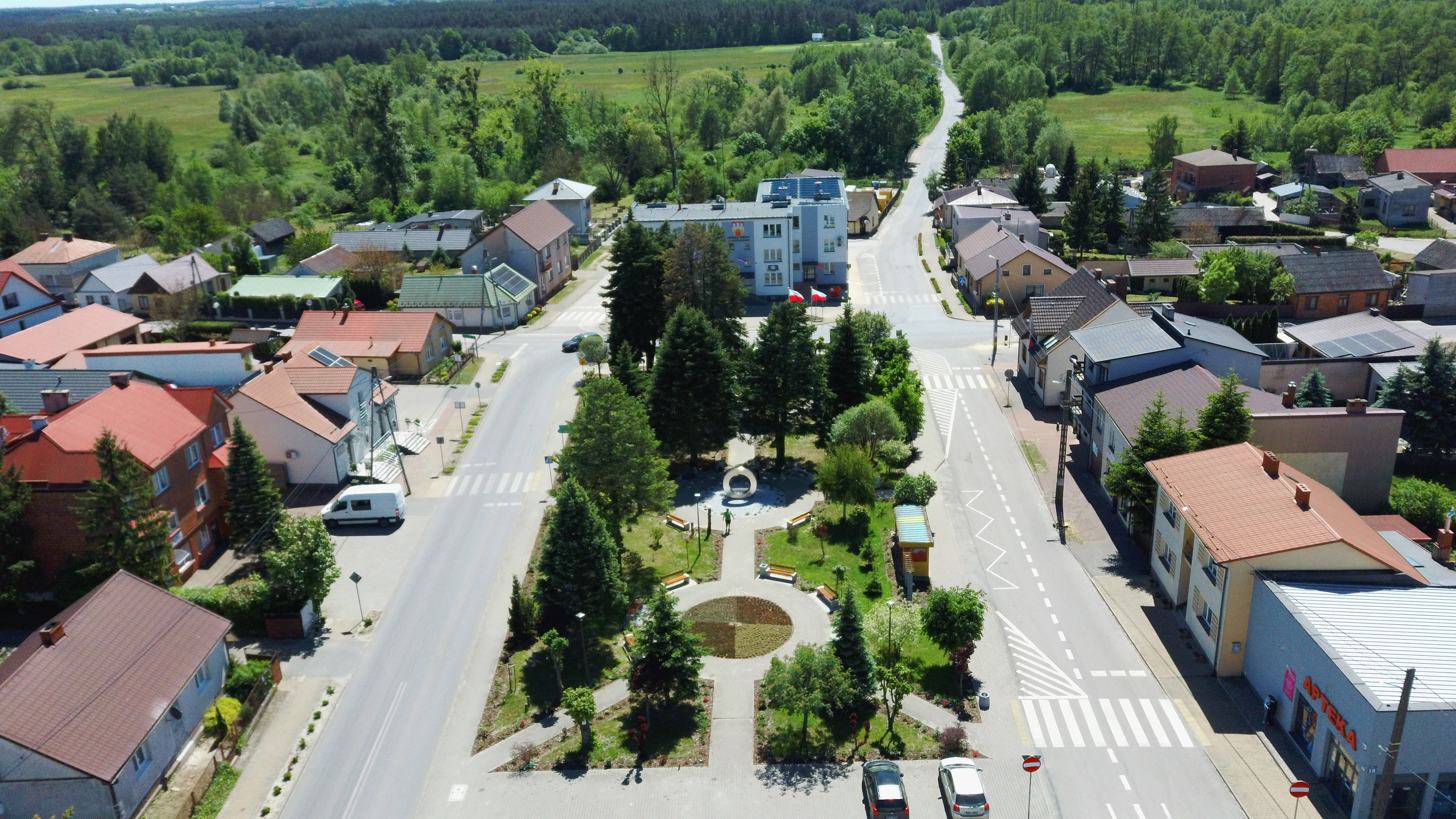

- Coat of arms

- Location within Poland
- Coordinates: 51°16′19″N 21°27′23″E
- Country: Poland
- Voivodeship: Masovian
- County: Zwoleń
- Gmina: Kazanów
- Founded: 1566

Population
  - Total: 460
- Time zone: UTC+1 (CET)
  - Summer (DST): UTC+2 (CEST)
- Vehicle registration: WZW

Kazanów [kaˈzanuf] is a town in Zwoleń County, Masovian Voivodeship, in east-central Poland. It is the seat of the gmina (administrative district) called Gmina Kazanów.

== History ==
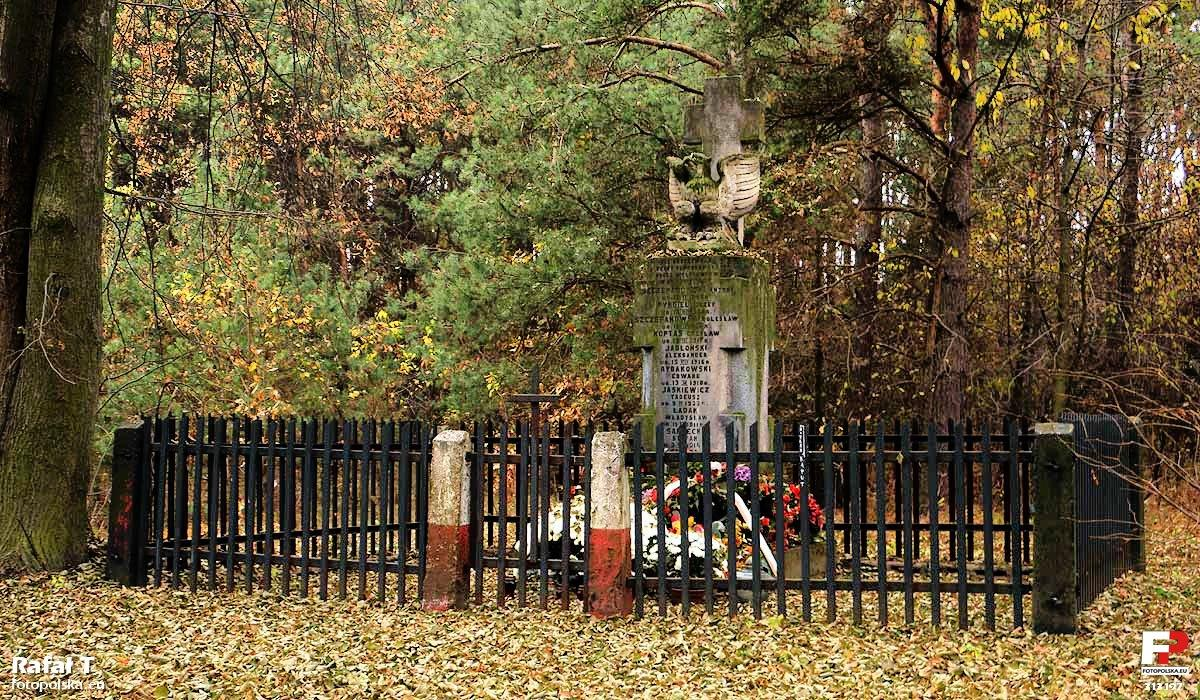
Memorial to the victims of German-perpetrated massacre from 1942

Kazanów was founded in 1566 by the decree of King Sigismund II Augustus on the premises of the adjacent village of Miechów, the heir of which was Marcin Kazanowski. It was a private town of the Kazanowski, Strzałkowski and Wąsowicz noble families, administratively located in the Sandomierz Voivodeship in the Lesser Poland Province of Poland.

During the German occupation (World War II), on 18 March 1942, the occupiers carried out a massacre of 16 Poles and 16 Jews.
