= Gmina Policzna =

Gmina Policzna Policzna Commune
- Gmina
- Interactive map of Gmina Policzna
- Coordinates (Policzna): 51°27′N 21°38′E
- Country: Poland
- Voivodeship: Masovian
- County: Zwoleń
- Seat: Policzna

Area
  - Total: 112.35 km^{2} (43.38 sq mi)

Population (2006)
  - Total: 5,895
  - Density: 52.47/km^{2} (135.9/sq mi)
- Website: http://www.policzna.ugm.pl

Gmina Policzna is a rural gmina (administrative district) in Zwoleń County, Masovian Voivodeship, in east-central Poland. Its seat is the village of Policzna, which lies approximately 11 kilometres (7 mi) north-east of Zwoleń and 96 km (59 mi) south-east of Warsaw.

The gmina covers an area of 112.35 square kilometres (43.4 sq mi), and as of 2006 its total population is 5,895.

== Villages ==
Gmina Policzna contains the villages and settlements of Aleksandrówka, Andrzejówka, Annów, Antoniówka, Biały Ług, Bierdzież, Chechły, Czarnolas, Czarnolas-Kolonia, Dąbrowa-Las, Florianów, Franków, Gródek, Helenów, Jabłonów, Jadwinów, Kolonia Chechelska, Kuszlów, Łuczynów, Ługowa Wola, Patków, Piątków, Policzna, Stanisławów, Świetlikowa Wola, Teodorów, Wilczowola, Władysławów, Wojciechówka, Wólka Policka, Wygoda, Zawada Nowa and Zawada Stara.

== Neighbouring gminas ==
Gmina Policzna is bordered by the gminas of Garbatka-Letnisko, Gniewoszów, Pionki, Przyłęk, Puławy and Zwoleń.
