= Tczów =

- Village
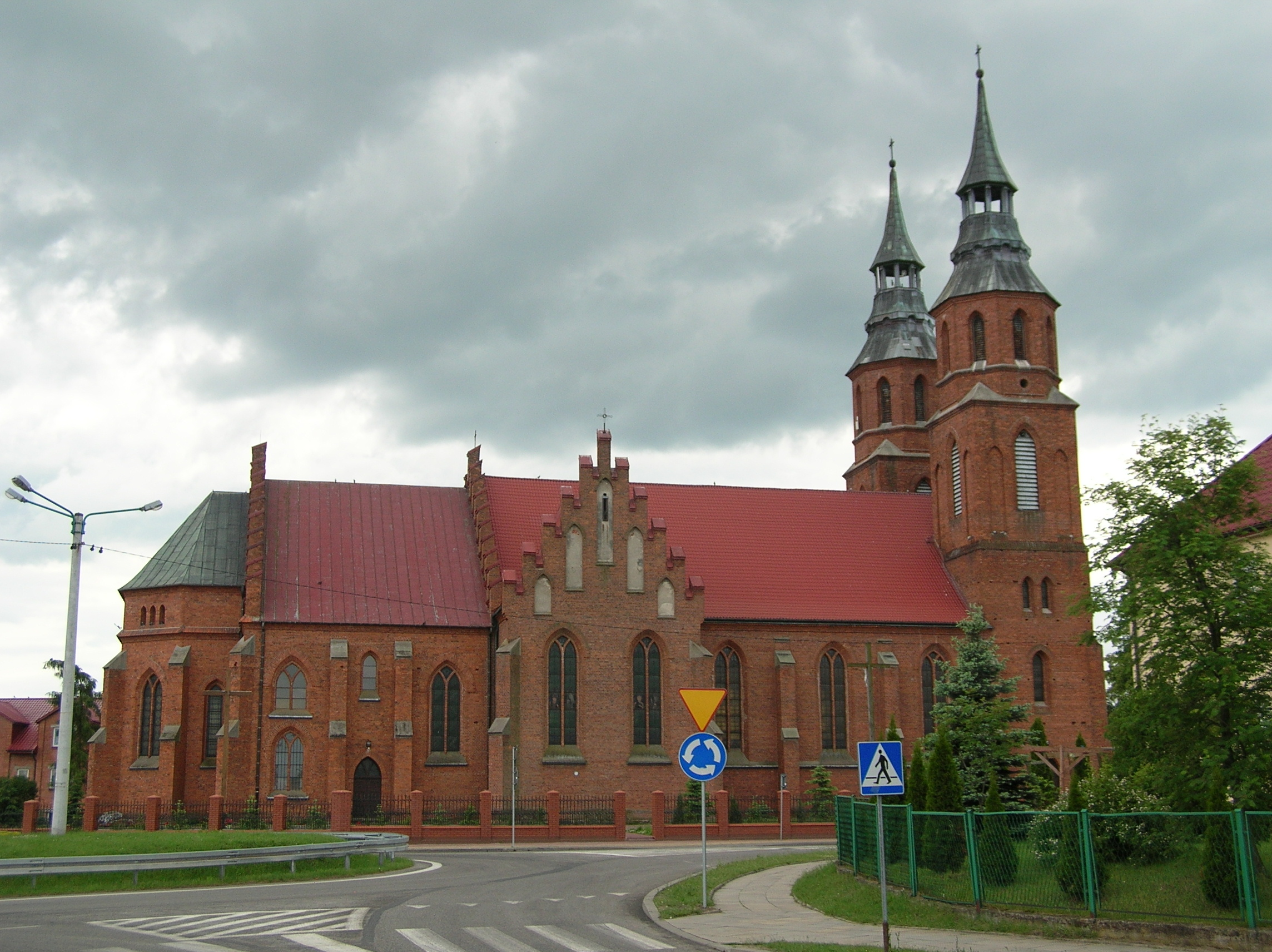

- Location within Poland
- Coordinates: 51°20′N 21°28′E
- Country: Poland
- Voivodeship: Masovian
- County: Zwoleń
- Gmina: Tczów
- Population: 620

Tczów [tt͡ʂuf] is a village in Zwoleń County, Masovian Voivodeship, in east-central Poland. It is the seat of the gmina (administrative district) called Gmina Tczów.
