= Miechów, Masovian Voivodeship =

Miechów
- Village
- Location within Poland
- Coordinates: 51°17′N 21°28′E
- Country: Poland
- Voivodeship: Masovian
- County: Zwoleń
- Gmina: Kazanów
- Time zone: UTC+1 (CET)
  - Summer (DST): UTC+2 (CEST)
- Vehicle registration: WZW

Miechów [ˈmjɛxuf] is a village in the administrative district of Gmina Kazanów, within Zwoleń County, Masovian Voivodeship, in east-central Poland.

In 1566, the adjacent town of Kazanów was founded by the decree of King Sigismund II Augustus on the premises of Miechów, when its heir was Marcin Kazanowski.
