= Zawada Nowa =

- Village
- Location within Poland
- Coordinates: 51°29′39″N 21°43′25″E
- Country: Poland
- Voivodeship: Masovian
- County: Zwoleń
- Gmina: Policzna

Zawada Nowa [zaˈvada ˈnɔva] is a village in the administrative district of Gmina Policzna, within Zwoleń County, Masovian Voivodeship, in east-central Poland.
