= Gmina Kazanów =

Gmina Kazanów Kazanów Commune
- Gmina
- Coat of arms
- Interactive map of Gmina Kazanów
- Coordinates (Kazanów): 51°16′19″N 21°27′23″E
- Country: Poland
- Voivodeship: Masovian
- County: Zwoleń
- Seat: Kazanów

Area
  - Total: 94.76 km^{2} (36.59 sq mi)

Population (2006)
  - Total: 4,699
  - Density: 49.59/km^{2} (128.4/sq mi)
- Website: https://www.kazanow.pl/

Gmina Kazanów is a rural gmina (administrative district) in Zwoleń County, Masovian Voivodeship, in east-central Poland. Its seat is the village of Kazanów, which lies approximately 12 kilometres (7 mi) south-west of Zwoleń and 110 km (68 mi) south-east of Warsaw.

The gmina covers an area of 94.76 square kilometres (36.6 sq mi), and as of 2006 its total population is 4,699.

== Villages ==
Gmina Kazanów contains the villages and settlements of Borów, Dębniak, Dębnica, Dobiec, Kazanów, Kopiec, Kowalków, Kowalków-Kolonia, Kroczów Mniejszy, Kroczów Większy, Miechów, Miechów-Kolonia, Niedarczów Dolny-Kolonia, Niedarczów Dolny-Wieś, Niedarczów Górny-Kolonia, Niedarczów Górny-Wieś, Ostrówka, Ostrownica, Ostrownica-Kolonia, Osuchów, Ruda, Wólka Gonciarska, Zakrzówek and Zakrzówek-Kolonia.

== Neighbouring gminas ==
Gmina Kazanów is bordered by the gminas of Ciepielów, Iłża, Skaryszew, Tczów and Zwoleń.
