= Przyłęk, Zwoleń County =

Przyłęk
- Village
- Location within Poland
- Coordinates: 51°20′N 21°45′E
- Country: Poland
- Voivodeship: Masovian
- County: Zwoleń
- Gmina: Przyłęk

Przyłęk [ˈpʂɨwɛŋk] is a village in Zwoleń County, Masovian Voivodeship, in east-central Poland. It is the seat of the gmina (administrative district) called Gmina Przyłęk.
