= Zawada (surname) =

Zawada is a Polish-language surname. Historically, due to the instability of the orthography, as well as in the periods of the partitions of Poland by foreign powers the same person or persons of the same family could use different spelling of the surname. Variant spellings include Zavada (Russified) and Sawada/Sowada (Germanized). The Czech/Slovak cognate is Závada.

Notable people with this surname include:

- Andrzej Zawada (1928–2000), Polish mountain climber
- Clay Zavada (born 1984), American baseball player
- David Zawada (born 1990), German mixed martial artist
- Jan Zawada (born 1988), Czech footballer
- Oskar Zawada (born 1996), Polish footballer
- Robert Zawada (1944–2024), Polish handball player
- Sławomir Zawada (born 1965), Polish weightlifter

== See also ==
- Zawadzki
- Zawadowski
- Zawady (disambiguation), place names
