= Zavada (surname) =

Zavada or Závada (Czech/Slovak feminine: Závadová) as a surname may refer to:

- Barbora Závadová (born 1993), Czech swimmer
- Clay Zavada (born 1984), American baseball player
- Pál Závada (born 1954), Slovak-Hungarian writer
- Vilém Závada (1905–1982), Czech poet and translator

== See also ==
- Zawada (surname)
