= Zawadki =

Zawadki may refer to the following places:

- Zawadki, Gmina Międzyrzec Podlaski, Biała County in Lublin Voivodeship (east Poland)
- Zawadki, Gmina Susiec, Tomaszów County in Lublin Voivodeship (east Poland)
- Zawadki, Masovian Voivodeship (east-central Poland)
