= Zawadka =

Zawadka may refer to the following places:

- Zawadka, Lower Silesian Voivodeship (south-west Poland)
- Zawadka, Lublin Voivodeship (east Poland)
- Zawadka, Limanowa County in Lesser Poland Voivodeship (south Poland)
- Zawadka, Miechów County in Lesser Poland Voivodeship (south Poland)
- Zawadka, Nowy Sącz County in Lesser Poland Voivodeship (south Poland)
- Zawadka, Wadowice County in Lesser Poland Voivodeship (south Poland)
- Zawadka, Strzyżów County in Subcarpathian Voivodeship (south-east Poland)
- Zawadka, Bieszczady County in Subcarpathian Voivodeship (south-east Poland)
- Zawadka, Myślenice County in Lesser Poland Voivodeship (south Poland)
- Zawadka, Gmina Koło in Greater Poland Voivodeship (central Poland)
- Zawadka, Gmina Olszówka in Greater Poland Voivodeship (central Poland)
- Zawadka, Silesian Voivodeship (south Poland)
- Zawadka, Pomeranian Voivodeship (north Poland)
- Zavadka, Skole Raion in Lviv Oblast (west Ukraine)
