= Zwoleń County =

Zwoleń County Powiat zwoleński
- County
- Flag Coat of arms

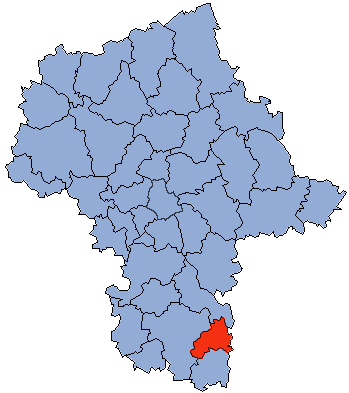
- Location within the voivodeship

- Division into gminas
- Coordinates (Zwoleń): 51°21′25″N 21°35′2″E
- Country: Poland
- Voivodeship: Masovian
- Seat: Zwoleń
- Gminas: Total 5: Gmina Kazanów; Gmina Policzna; Gmina Przyłęk; Gmina Tczów; Gmina Zwoleń

Area
  - Total: 571.24 km^{2} (220.56 sq mi)

Population (2019)
  - Total: 36,222
  - Density: 63.409/km^{2} (164.23/sq mi)
  - Urban: 7,698
  - Rural: 28,524
- Car plates: WZW
- Website: www.zwolenpowiat.pl

Zwoleń County (Polish: powiat zwoleński) is a unit of territorial administration and local government (powiat) in Masovian Voivodeship, east-central Poland. It came into being on 1 January 1999, as a result of the Polish local government reforms passed in 1998. Its administrative seat and only town is Zwoleń, which lies 104 kilometres (65 mi) south-east of Warsaw.

The county covers an area of 571.24 square kilometres (220.6 sq mi). As of 2019 its total population is 36,222, out of which the population of Zwoleń is 7,698, and the rural population is 28,524.

== Neighbouring counties ==
Zwoleń County is bordered by Kozienice County to the north, Puławy County to the east, Opole County to the south-east, Lipsko County to the south and Radom County to the west.

== Administrative divisions ==
The county is subdivided into five gminas (one urban-rural and four rural). These are listed in the following table, in descending order of population.

Gmina	Type	Area (km^{2})	Population (2019)	Seat
Gmina Zwoleń	urban-rural	161.1	15,104	Zwoleń
Gmina Przyłęk	rural	130.9	6,155	Przyłęk
Gmina Policzna	rural	112.4	5,541	Policzna
Gmina Tczów	rural	72.1	4,906	Tczów
Gmina Kazanów	rural	94.8	4,516	Kazanów

== Agriculture and cuisine ==
Zwoleń County is one of the main areas of strawberry cultivation in Poland, which is one of the main strawberry producers in Europe. Zwoleń strawberries and konfitura truskawkowa (a type of traditional Polish strawberry jam) are officially protected traditional foods of the area, as designated by the Ministry of Agriculture and Rural Development of Poland.

== Transport ==
The National roads 12 and 79, and Voivodeship roads 733 and 787 pass through the county.
