= Józefów (disambiguation) =

Józefów (derived from Józef, Polish version of the name Joseph) is a very common placename in Poland.

Towns

- Józefów in Masovian Voivodeship, near Warsaw
- Józefów, Biłgoraj County in Lublin Voivodeship (east Poland)

Villages

- Józefów, Gmina Bełchatów in Łódź Voivodeship (central Poland)
- Józefów, Gmina Drużbice in Łódź Voivodeship (central Poland)
- Józefów, Brzeziny County in Łódź Voivodeship (central Poland)
- Józefów, Kutno County in Łódź Voivodeship (central Poland)
- Józefów, Łask County in Łódź Voivodeship (central Poland)
- Józefów, Łęczyca County in Łódź Voivodeship (central Poland)
- Józefów, Opoczno County in Łódź Voivodeship (central Poland)
- Józefów, Gmina Poddębice in Łódź Voivodeship (central Poland)
- Józefów, Gmina Zadzim in Łódź Voivodeship (central Poland)
- Józefów, Gmina Kodrąb in Łódź Voivodeship (central Poland)
- Józefów, Gmina Ładzice in Łódź Voivodeship (central Poland)
- Józefów, Gmina Przedbórz in Łódź Voivodeship (central Poland)
- Józefów, Rawa County in Łódź Voivodeship (central Poland)
- Józefów, Sieradz County in Łódź Voivodeship (central Poland)
- Józefów, Skierniewice County in Łódź Voivodeship (central Poland)
- Józefów, Gmina Czerniewice, Tomaszów County in Łódź Voivodeship (central Poland)
- Józefów, Wieluń County in Łódź Voivodeship (central Poland)
- Józefów, Wieruszów County in Łódź Voivodeship (central Poland)
- Józefów, Zgierz County in Łódź Voivodeship (central Poland)
- Józefów, Chełm County in Lublin Voivodeship (east Poland)
- Józefów, Gmina Gorzków in Lublin Voivodeship (east Poland)
- Józefów, Lublin County in Lublin Voivodeship (east Poland)
- Józefów, Łuków County in Lublin Voivodeship (east Poland)
- Józefów, Gmina Mełgiew in Lublin Voivodeship (east Poland)
- Józefów, Gmina Piaski in Lublin Voivodeship (east Poland)
- Józefów, Włodawa County in Lublin Voivodeship (east Poland)
- Józefów, Mielec County in Subcarpathian Voivodeship (south-east Poland)
- Józefów, Stalowa Wola County in Subcarpathian Voivodeship (south-east Poland)
- Józefów, Gmina Górzno in Masovian Voivodeship (east-central Poland)
- Józefów, Gmina Żelechów in Masovian Voivodeship (east-central Poland)
- Józefów, Gmina Goszczyn in Masovian Voivodeship (east-central Poland)
- Józefów, Gmina Nowe Miasto nad Pilicą in Masovian Voivodeship (east-central Poland)
- Józefów, Gmina Pniewy in Masovian Voivodeship (east-central Poland)
- Józefów, Legionowo County in Masovian Voivodeship (east-central Poland)
- Józefów, Lipsko County in Masovian Voivodeship (east-central Poland)
- Józefów, Mińsk County in Masovian Voivodeship (east-central Poland)
- Józefów, Radom County in Masovian Voivodeship (east-central Poland)
- Józefów, Gmina Kampinos in Masovian Voivodeship (east-central Poland)
- Józefów, Gmina Dąbrówka in Masovian Voivodeship (east-central Poland)
- Józefów, Gmina Strachówka in Masovian Voivodeship (east-central Poland)
- Józefów, Gmina Zwoleń in Masovian Voivodeship (east-central Poland)
- Józefów, Gmina Tczów in Masovian Voivodeship (east-central Poland)
- Józefów, Żyrardów County in Masovian Voivodeship (east-central Poland)
- Józefów, Gmina Godziesze Wielkie in Greater Poland Voivodeship (west-central Poland)
- Józefów, Gmina Lisków in Greater Poland Voivodeship (west-central Poland)
- Józefów, Gmina Opatówek in Greater Poland Voivodeship (west-central Poland)
- Józefów, Krotoszyn County in Greater Poland Voivodeship (west-central Poland)
- Józefów, Gmina Raszków, Ostrów County in Greater Poland Voivodeship (west-central Poland)
- Józefów, Pleszew County in Greater Poland Voivodeship (west-central Poland)
- Józefów, Gmina Dobra in Greater Poland Voivodeship (west-central Poland)
- Józefów, Gmina Władysławów in Greater Poland Voivodeship (west-central Poland)
- Józefów, Lubusz Voivodeship (west Poland)
- Józefów, Opole Voivodeship (south-west Poland)

== See also ==
- Józefów Massacre
- Józefów nad Wisłą
- Gmina Józefów
- Josefov (disambiguation)
