= Josefov (disambiguation) =

Josefov is a town quarter in Prague, Czech Republic, known as the Jewish quarter.

Josefov may also refer to places in the Czech Republic:

- Josefov (Hodonín District), a municipality and village in the South Moravian Region
- Josefov (Sokolov District), a municipality and village in the Karlovy Vary Region
- Josefov, a town part of Jaroměř in the Hradec Králové Region
  - Josefov Fortress, a former fortress in Josefov
  - Josefov Meadows, a bird reserve near Josefov
- Josefov, a village and part of Rožná in the Vysočina Region

== See also ==
- Joseph II
- Józefów (disambiguation)
- Józefków (disambiguation)
