= Budki Petrykowskie =

- Village
- Location within Poland
- Coordinates: 51°55′20″N 20°40′6″E
- Country: Poland
- Voivodeship: Masovian
- County: Grójec
- Gmina: Pniewy
- Elevation: 182 m (597 ft)
- Population: 80

Budki Petrykowskie [ˈbutki pɛtrɨˈkɔfskʲɛ] is a village in the administrative district of Gmina Pniewy, within Grójec County, Masovian Voivodeship, in east-central Poland.
