= Wilczoruda =

- Village
- Location within Poland
- Coordinates: 51°53′13″N 20°40′21″E
- Country: Poland
- Voivodeship: Masovian
- County: Grójec
- Gmina: Pniewy
- Elevation: 175 m (574 ft)
- Population: 110

Wilczoruda [vilt͡ʂɔˈruda] is a village in the administrative district of Gmina Pniewy, within Grójec County, Masovian Voivodeship, in east-central Poland.
