= Osieczek, Masovian Voivodeship =

Osieczek
- Village
- Location within Poland
- Coordinates: 51°53′23″N 20°43′45″E
- Country: Poland
- Voivodeship: Masovian
- County: Grójec
- Gmina: Pniewy

Osieczek [ɔˈɕɛt͡ʂɛk] is a village in the administrative district of Gmina Pniewy, within Grójec County, Masovian Voivodeship, in east-central Poland.
