= Dąbrówka, Grójec County =

Village in Gmina Pniewy, Poland

Dąbrówka
- Village
- Location within Poland
- Coordinates: 51°52′19″N 20°43′47″E
- Country: Poland
- Voivodeship: Masovian
- County: Grójec
- Gmina: Pniewy

Dąbrówka [dɔmˈbrufka] is a village in the administrative district of Gmina Pniewy, within Grójec County, Masovian Voivodeship, in east-central Poland.
