= Kornelówka, Masovian Voivodeship =

Village in Gmina Pniewy, Poland

Kornelówka
- Village
- Location within Poland
- Coordinates: 51°56′24″N 20°42′32″E
- Country: Poland
- Voivodeship: Masovian
- County: Grójec
- Gmina: Pniewy

Kornelówka [kɔrnɛˈlufka] is a village in the administrative district of Gmina Pniewy, within Grójec County, Masovian Voivodeship, in east-central Poland.
