= Bądków-Kolonia =

- Village
- Location within Poland
- Coordinates: 51°45′16″N 20°49′26″E
- Country: Poland
- Voivodeship: Masovian
- County: Grójec
- Gmina: Goszczyn

Bądków-Kolonia [ˈbɔntkuf kɔˈlɔɲa] is a village in the administrative district of Gmina Goszczyn, within Grójec County, Masovian Voivodeship, in east-central Poland.
