= Sielec, Grójec County =

Sielec
- Village
- Location within Poland
- Coordinates: 51°44′N 20°48′E
- Country: Poland
- Voivodeship: Masovian
- County: Grójec
- Gmina: Goszczyn

Sielec [ˈɕɛlɛt͡s] is a village in the administrative district of Gmina Goszczyn, within Grójec County, Masovian Voivodeship, in east-central Poland.
