= Nowa Długowola =

Village in Gmina Goszczyn, Poland

- Village
- Location within Poland
- Coordinates: 51°44′39″N 20°52′37″E
- Country: Poland
- Voivodeship: Masovian
- County: Grójec
- Gmina: Goszczyn

Nowa Długowola [ˈnɔva dwuɡɔˈvɔla] is a village in the administrative district of Gmina Goszczyn, within Grójec County, Masovian Voivodeship, in east-central Poland.
