= Daszew =

- Village
- Location within Poland
- Coordinates: 51°52′34″N 20°41′33″E
- Country: Poland
- Voivodeship: Masovian
- County: Grójec
- Gmina: Pniewy

Daszew [ˈdaʂɛf] is a village in the administrative district of Gmina Pniewy, within Grójec County, Masovian Voivodeship, in east-central Poland.
