= Wilczoruda-Parcela =

- Village
- Location within Poland
- Coordinates: 51°53′34″N 20°40′28″E
- Country: Poland
- Voivodeship: Masovian
- County: Grójec
- Gmina: Pniewy
- Elevation: 164 m (538 ft)
- Population: 130

Wilczoruda-Parcela [vilt͡ʂɔˈruda parˈt͡sɛla] is a village in the administrative district of Gmina Pniewy, within Grójec County, Masovian Voivodeship, in east-central Poland.
