= Romanów, Grójec County =

Romanów
- Village
- Location within Poland
- Coordinates: 51°47′N 20°52′E
- Country: Poland
- Voivodeship: Masovian
- County: Grójec
- Gmina: Goszczyn

Romanów [rɔˈmanuf] is a village in the administrative district of Gmina Goszczyn, within Grójec County, Masovian Voivodeship, in east-central Poland.
