= Gmina Goszczyn =

Gmina Goszczyn Goszczyn Commune
- Gmina
- Coat of arms
- Interactive map of Gmina Goszczyn
- Coordinates (Goszczyn): 51°43′49″N 20°51′12″E
- Country: Poland
- Voivodeship: Masovian
- County: Grójec
- Seat: Goszczyn

Area
  - Total: 56.99 km^{2} (22.00 sq mi)

Population (2006)
  - Total: 2,943
  - Density: 51.64/km^{2} (133.7/sq mi)
- Website: http://www.goszczyn.com.pl

Gmina Goszczyn is a rural gmina (administrative district) in Grójec County, Masovian Voivodeship, in east-central Poland. Its seat is the village of Goszczyn, which lies approximately 16 kilometres (10 mi) south of Grójec and 55 km (34 mi) south of Warsaw.

The gmina covers an area of 56.99 square kilometres (22.0 sq mi), and as of 2006 its total population is 2,943.

== Villages ==
Gmina Goszczyn contains the villages and settlements of Bądków, Bądków-Kolonia, Długowola, Goszczyn, Jakubów, Józefów, Modrzewina, Nowa Długowola, Olszew, Romanów and Sielec.

== Neighbouring gminas ==
Gmina Goszczyn is bordered by the gminas of Belsk Duży, Jasieniec, Mogielnica and Promna.
