= Gmina Pniewy, Masovian Voivodeship =

Gmina Pniewy Pniewy Commune
- Gmina
- Coat of arms
- Interactive map of Gmina Pniewy
- Coordinates (Pniewy): 51°55′N 20°44′E
- Country: Poland
- Voivodeship: Masovian
- County: Grójec
- Seat: Pniewy

Area
  - Total: 102.05 km^{2} (39.40 sq mi)

Population (2006)
  - Total: 4,597
  - Density: 45.05/km^{2} (116.7/sq mi)
- Website: http://www.pniewy-maz.bazagmin.pl/

Gmina Pniewy is a rural gmina (administrative district) in Grójec County, Masovian Voivodeship, in east-central Poland. Its seat is the village of Pniewy, which lies approximately 10 kilometres (6 mi) north-west of Grójec and 40 km (25 mi) south-west of Warsaw.

The gmina covers an area of 102.05 square kilometres (39.4 sq mi), and as of 2006 its total population is 4,597.

== Villages ==
Gmina Pniewy contains the villages and settlements of Aleksandrów, Budki Petrykowskie, Ciechlin, Cychry, Dąbrówka, Daszew, Ginetówka, Jeziora, Jeziora-Nowina, Jeziórka, Józefów, Jurki, Karolew, Kocerany, Kolonia Jurki, Konie, Kornelówka, Kruszew, Kruszewek, Michrów, Michrów-Stefów, Michrówek, Natalin, Nowina-Przęsławice, Osieczek, Pniewy, Przęsławice, Przykory, Rosołów, Teodorówka, Wiatrowiec, Wilczoruda, Wilczoruda-Parcela, Witalówka, Wola Grabska, Wola Pniewska, Wólka Załęska and Załęże Duże.

== Neighbouring gminas ==
Gmina Pniewy is bordered by the gminas of Belsk Duży, Błędów, Grójec, Mszczonów, Tarczyn and Żabia Wola.
