= Ginetówka =

Village in Gmina Pniewy, Poland

- Village
- Location within Poland
- Coordinates: 51°51′36″N 20°42′04″E
- Country: Poland
- Voivodeship: Masovian
- County: Grójec
- Gmina: Pniewy

Ginetówka [ɡinɛˈtufka] is a village in the administrative district of Gmina Pniewy, within Grójec County, Masovian Voivodeship, in east-central Poland.
