= Bądków, Masovian Voivodeship =

Bądków
- Village
- Location within Poland
- Coordinates: 51°45′N 20°51′E
- Country: Poland
- Voivodeship: Masovian
- County: Grójec
- Gmina: Goszczyn

Bądków [ˈbɔntkuf] is a village in the administrative district of Gmina Goszczyn, within Grójec County, Masovian Voivodeship, in east-central Poland.
