= Wola Pniewska =

- Village
- Location within Poland
- Coordinates: 51°56′N 20°46′E
- Country: Poland
- Voivodeship: Masovian
- County: Grójec
- Gmina: Pniewy

Wola Pniewska [ˈvɔla ˈpɲɛfska] is a village in the administrative district of Gmina Pniewy, within Grójec County, Masovian Voivodeship, in east-central Poland.
