= Karolew, Grójec County =

Karolew
- Village
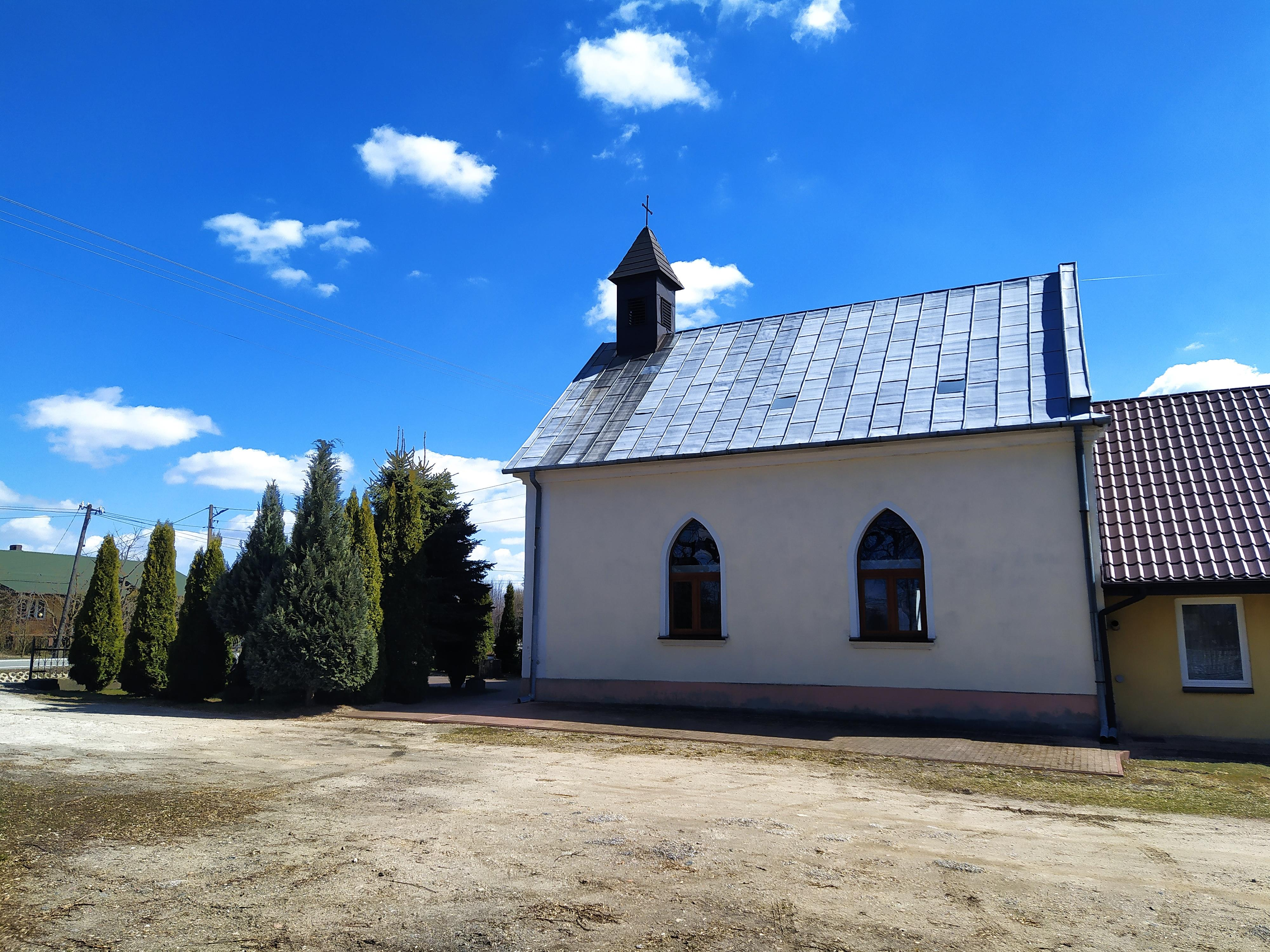
- Saint Giles Church in Karolew

- Location within Poland
- Coordinates: 51°54′59″N 20°41′10″E
- Country: Poland
- Voivodeship: Masovian
- County: Grójec
- Gmina: Pniewy
- Elevation: 185 m (607 ft)
- Population: 190

Karolew [kaˈrɔlɛf] is a village in the administrative district of Gmina Pniewy, within Grójec County, Masovian Voivodeship, in east-central Poland.
