= Michrów =

- Village
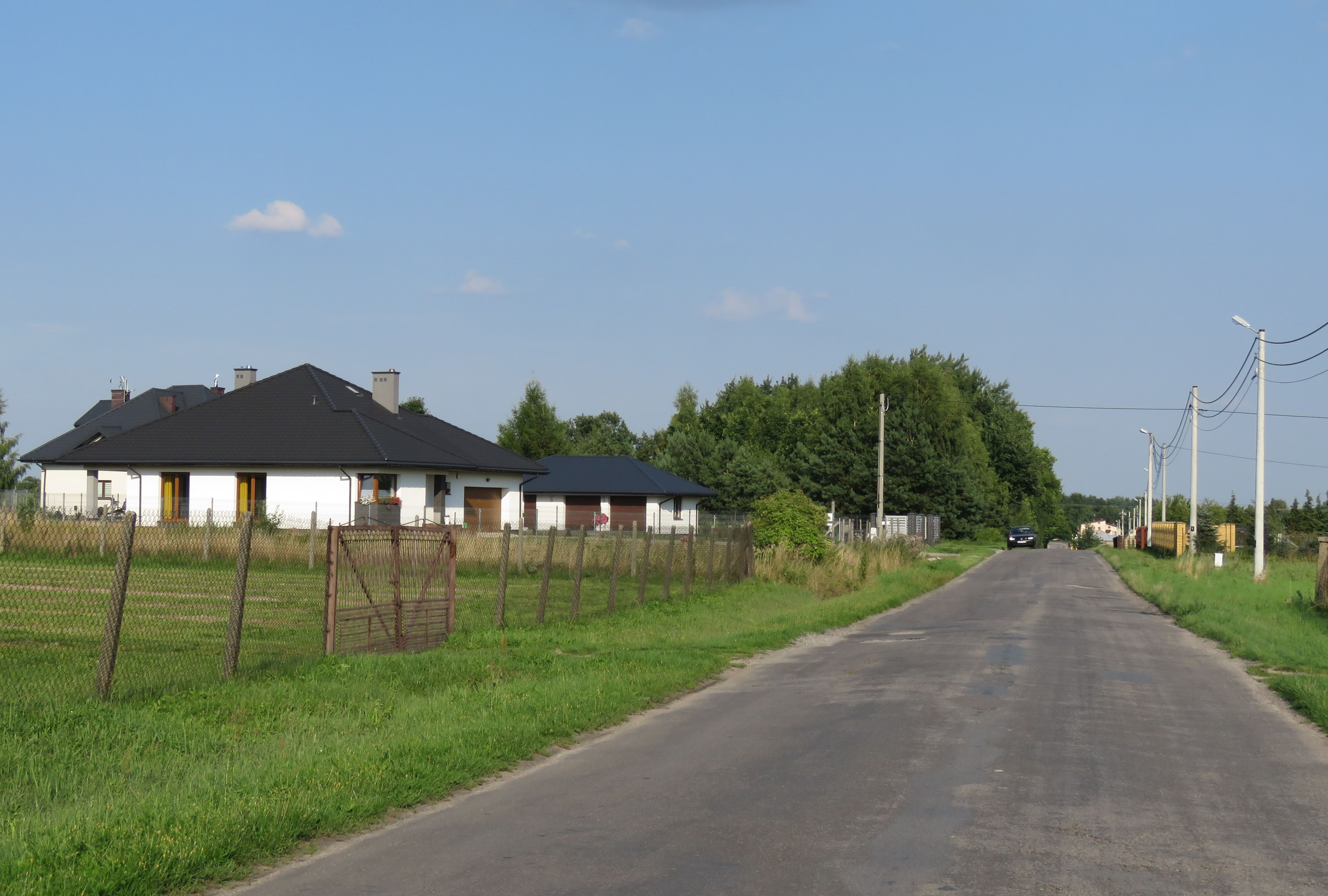

- Location within Poland
- Coordinates: 51°57′N 20°48′E
- Country: Poland
- Voivodeship: Masovian
- County: Grójec
- Gmina: Pniewy

Population
  - Total: 390
- Time zone: UTC+1 (CET)
  - Summer (DST): UTC+2 (CEST)

Michrów [ˈmixruf] is a village in the administrative district of Gmina Pniewy, within Grójec County, Masovian Voivodeship, in east-central Poland.

Six Polish citizens were murdered by Nazi Germany in the village during World War II.
