= Wola Grabska =

- Village
- Location within Poland
- Coordinates: 51°51′48″N 20°44′34″E
- Country: Poland
- Voivodeship: Masovian
- County: Grójec
- Gmina: Pniewy

Wola Grabska [ˈvɔla ˈɡrapska] is a village in the administrative district of Gmina Pniewy, within Grójec County, Masovian Voivodeship, in east-central Poland.

== Etymology ==
Wola is a name given to agricultural villages, Grabska means "from Grab" and this probably relates to Grab, a village in Poland
