= Michrów-Stefów =

- Village
- Location within Poland
- Coordinates: 51°56′13″N 20°45′07″E
- Country: Poland
- Voivodeship: Masovian
- County: Grójec
- Gmina: Pniewy

Michrów-Stefów [ˈmixruf ˈstɛfuf] is a village in the administrative district of Gmina Pniewy, within Grójec County, Masovian Voivodeship, in east-central Poland.
