= Jeziora, Masovian Voivodeship =

Jeziora
- Village
- Location within Poland
- Coordinates: 51°53′19″N 20°45′41″E
- Country: Poland
- Voivodeship: Masovian
- County: Grójec
- Gmina: Pniewy
- Population: 200

Jeziora [jɛˈʑɔra] is a village in the administrative district of Gmina Pniewy, within Grójec County, Masovian Voivodeship, in east-central Poland.
