= Jurki =

Jurki may refer to the following places:

- Jurki, Lublin Voivodeship (east Poland)
- Jurki, Masovian Voivodeship (east-central Poland)
- Jurki, Podlaskie Voivodeship (north-east Poland)
- Jurki, Pomeranian Voivodeship (north Poland)
- Jurki, Olecko County in Warmian-Masurian Voivodeship (north Poland)
- Jurki, Ostróda County in Warmian-Masurian Voivodeship (north Poland)
