= Jakubów, Gmina Goszczyn =

Jakubów
- Village
- Location within Poland
- Coordinates: 51°45′22″N 20°48′4″E
- Country: Poland
- Voivodeship: Masovian
- County: Grójec
- Gmina: Goszczyn

Jakubów [jaˈkubuf] is a village in the administrative district of Gmina Goszczyn, within Grójec County, Masovian Voivodeship, in east-central Poland.
