= Przeslawice =

Przesławice may refer to:

- Przesławice, Kuyavian-Pomeranian Voivodeship (north-central Poland)
- Przesławice, Miechów County, Lesser Poland Voivodeship (south Poland)
- Przesławice, Proszowice County, Lesser Poland Voivodeship (south Poland)
- Przęsławice, Grójec County, Masovian Voivodeship (east-central Poland)
- Przęsławice, Sochaczew County, Masovian Voivodeship (east-central Poland)
