= Wiatrowiec, Masovian Voivodeship =

Wiatrowiec
- Village
- Location within Poland
- Coordinates: 51°53′N 20°40′E
- Country: Poland
- Voivodeship: Masovian
- County: Grójec
- Gmina: Pniewy

Wiatrowiec [vjaˈtrɔvjɛt͡s] is a village in the administrative district of Gmina Pniewy, within Grójec County, Masovian Voivodeship, in east-central Poland.
