= Nowina-Przęsławice =

- Village
- Location within Poland
- Coordinates: 51°54′06″N 20°48′27″E
- Country: Poland
- Voivodeship: Masovian
- County: Grójec
- Gmina: Pniewy

Nowina-Przęsławice [nɔˈvina pʂɛ̃swaˈvit͡sɛ] is a village in the administrative district of Gmina Pniewy, within Grójec County, Masovian Voivodeship, in east-central Poland.
