= Teodorówka, Masovian Voivodeship =

Teodorówka
- Village
- Location within Poland
- Coordinates: 51°53′22″N 20°41′23″E
- Country: Poland
- Voivodeship: Masovian
- County: Grójec
- Gmina: Pniewy
- Elevation: 165 m (541 ft)
- Population: 80

Teodorówka [tɛɔdɔˈrufka] is a village in the administrative district of Gmina Pniewy, within Grójec County, Masovian Voivodeship, in east-central Poland.
