= Wolka Zaleska =

Wolka Zaleska may refer to the following places in Poland:

- Wólka Załęska, Grójec County, Masovian Voivodeship (east-central Poland)
- Wólka Załęska, Piaseczno County, Masovian Voivodeship (east-central Poland)
- Wólka Zaleska, Masovian Voivodeship (east-central Poland)
- Wólka Zaleska, Podlaskie Voivodeship (north-east Poland)
