= Konie =

- Village
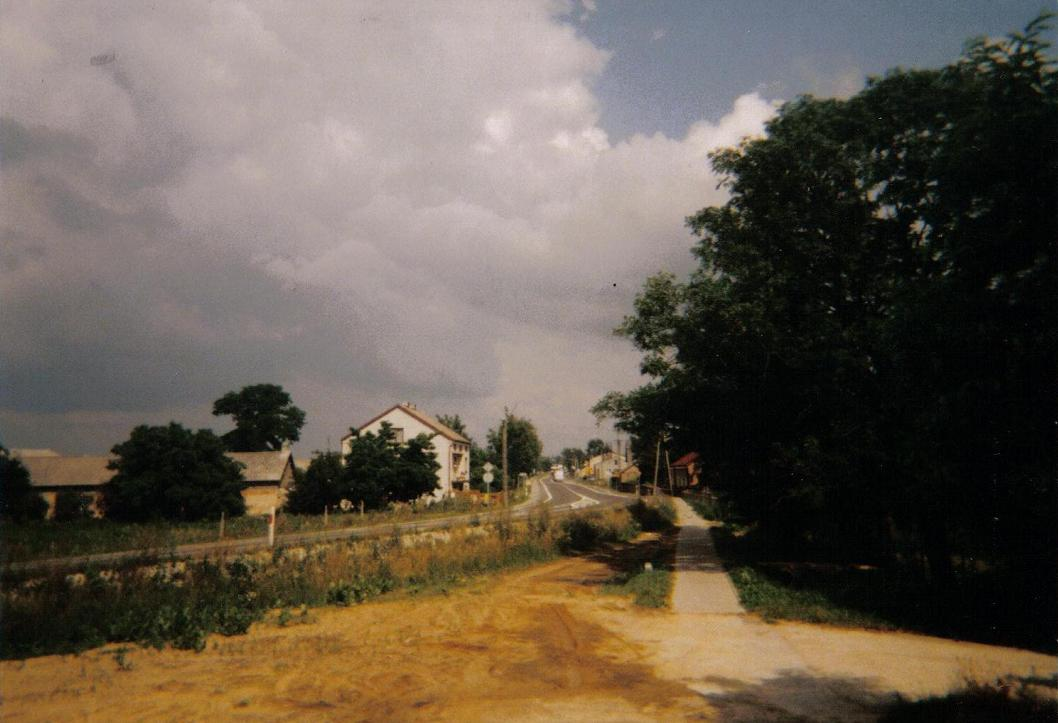

- Location within Poland
- Coordinates: 51°54′45″N 20°42′45″E
- Country: Poland
- Voivodeship: Masovian
- County: Grójec
- Gmina: Pniewy
- Elevation: 186 m (610 ft)
- Population: 180

Konie [ˈkɔɲɛ] is a village in the administrative district of Gmina Pniewy, within Grójec County, Masovian Voivodeship, in east-central Poland.
