= Ciechlin =

- Village
- Location within Poland
- Coordinates: 51°51′57″N 20°40′58″E
- Country: Poland
- Voivodeship: Masovian
- County: Grójec
- Gmina: Pniewy
- Elevation: 188 m (617 ft)
- Population: 200

Ciechlin [ˈt͡ɕɛxlin] is a village in the administrative district of Gmina Pniewy, within Grójec County, Masovian Voivodeship, in east-central Poland.
