= Jeziórka =

- Village
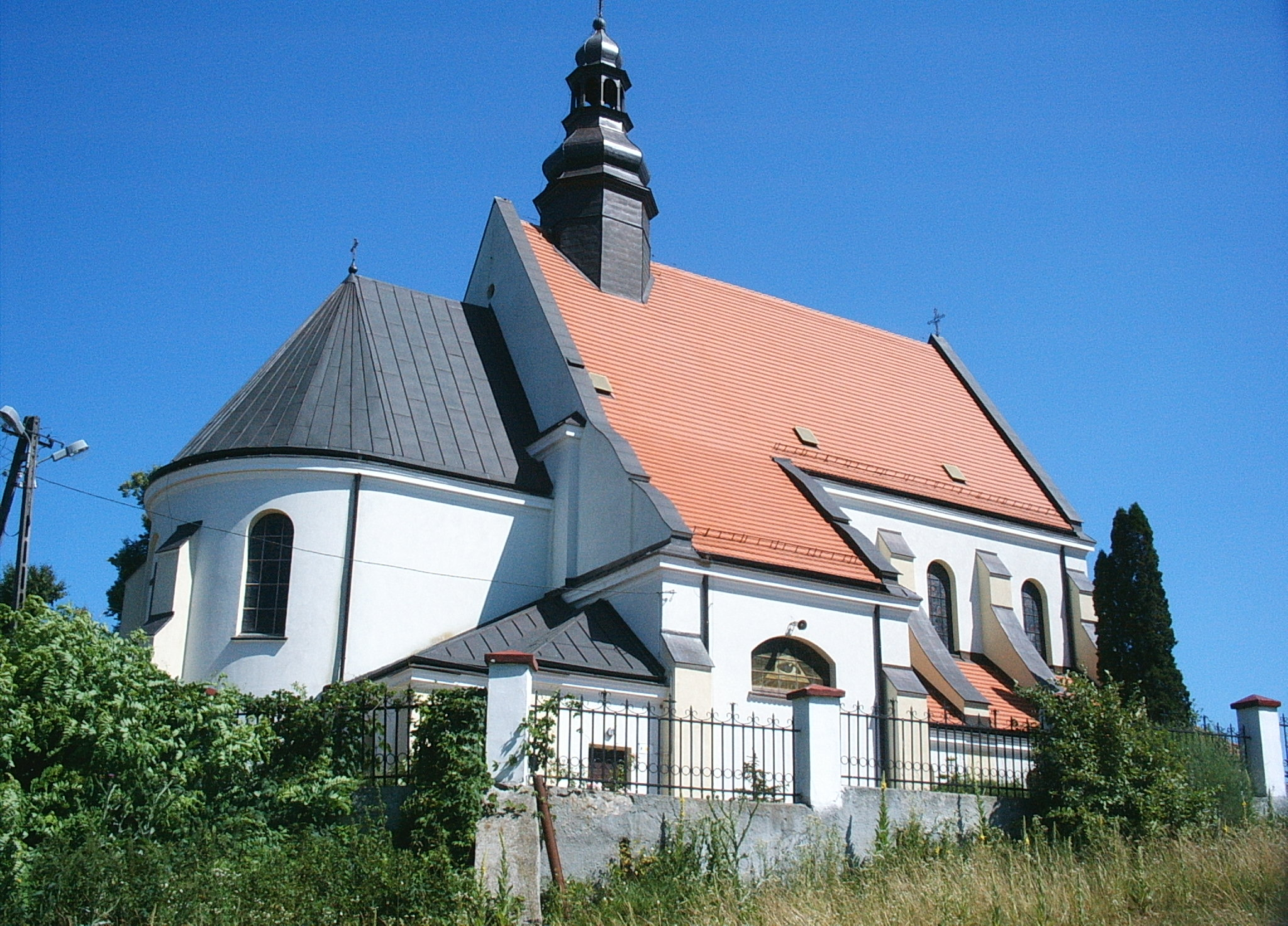
- Church in Jeziorka, Grójec County

- Location within Poland
- Coordinates: 51°52′58″N 20°45′07″E
- Country: Poland
- Voivodeship: Masovian
- County: Grójec
- Gmina: Pniewy

Jeziórka [jɛˈʑurka] is a village in the administrative district of Gmina Pniewy, within Grójec County, Masovian Voivodeship, in east-central Poland.
