= Aleksandrów, Grójec County =

Aleksandrów
- Village
- Location within Poland
- Coordinates: 51°55′32″N 20°43′0″E
- Country: Poland
- Voivodeship: Masovian
- County: Grójec
- Gmina: Pniewy

Aleksandrów [alɛkˈsandruf] is a village in the administrative district of Gmina Pniewy, within Grójec County, Masovian Voivodeship, in east-central Poland.
