= Kruszew, Grójec County =

Kruszew
- Village
- Location within Poland
- Coordinates: 51°55′N 20°47′E
- Country: Poland
- Voivodeship: Masovian
- County: Grójec
- Gmina: Pniewy

Kruszew [ˈkruʂɛf] is a village in the administrative district of Gmina Pniewy, within Grójec County, Masovian Voivodeship, in east-central Poland.
