= Kolonia Jurki =

- Village
- Location within Poland
- Coordinates: 51°54′39″N 20°48′01″E
- Country: Poland
- Voivodeship: Masovian
- County: Grójec
- Gmina: Pniewy

Kolonia Jurki [kɔˈlɔɲa ˈjurki] is a village in the administrative district of Gmina Pniewy, within Grójec County, Masovian Voivodeship, in east-central Poland.
