= Józefów, Gmina Goszczyn =

Józefów
- Village
- Location within Poland
- Coordinates: 51°45′29″N 20°55′44″E
- Country: Poland
- Voivodeship: Masovian
- County: Grójec
- Gmina: Goszczyn

Józefów (Polish pronunciation: [juˈzɛfuf]) is a village in the administrative district of Gmina Goszczyn, within Grójec County, Masovian Voivodeship, in east-central Poland.
