= Modrzewina, Masovian Voivodeship =

Modrzewina
- Village
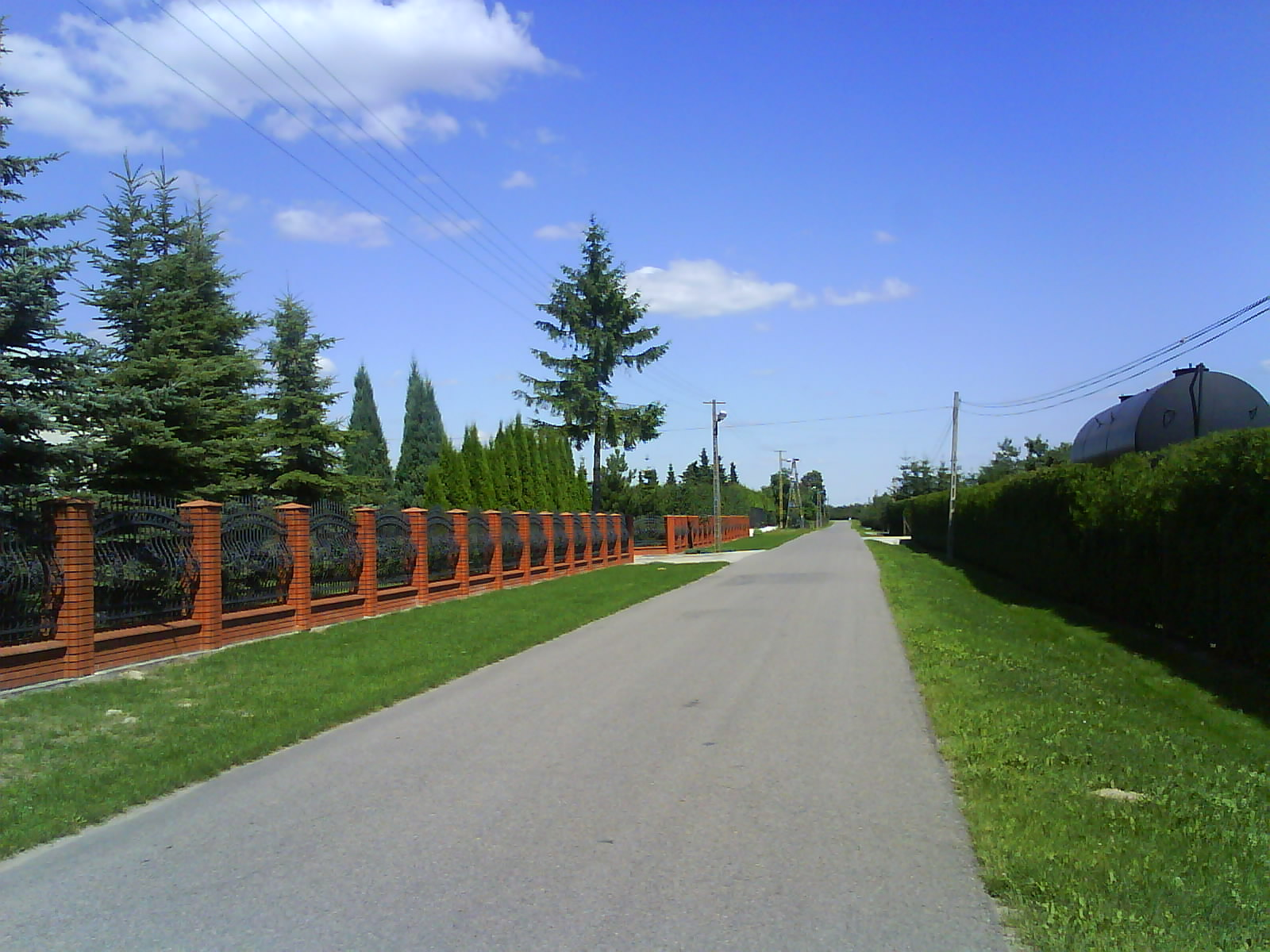
- Modrzewina's main road

- Location within Poland
- Coordinates: 51°44′N 20°47′E
- Country: Poland
- Voivodeship: Masovian
- County: Grójec
- Gmina: Goszczyn
- Population: 70

Modrzewina [mɔdʐɛˈvina] is a village in the administrative district of Gmina Goszczyn, within Grójec County, Masovian Voivodeship, in central Poland.
