= Marek Suski =

Polish politician

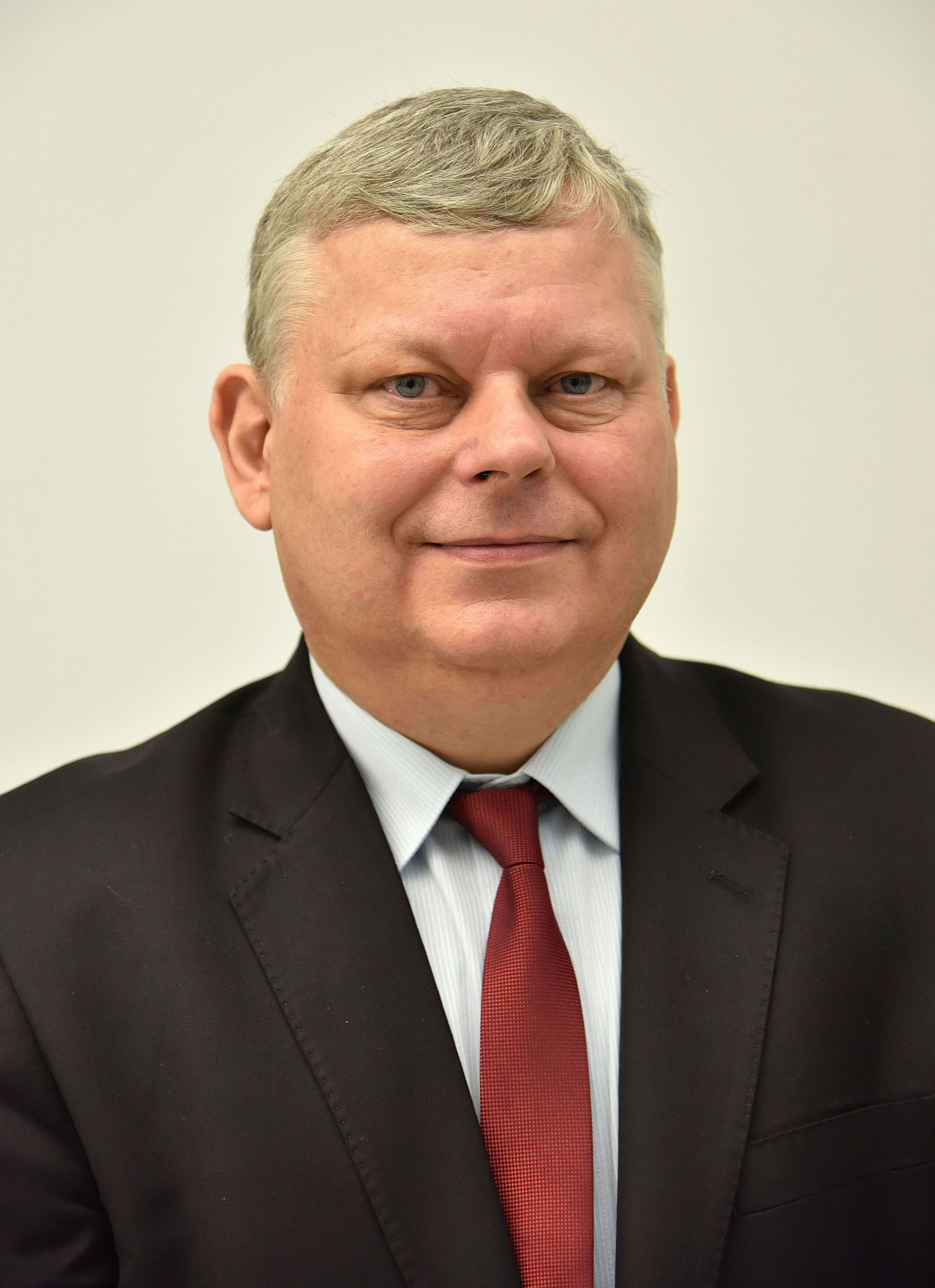

Member of the Sejm
- Incumbent
- Assumed office 23 September 2001
- Constituency: 17 Radom

Personal details
- Born: 11 June 1958 (age 67) Grójec
- Party: Law and Justice
- Profession: Theatrical technician, politician

Marek Witold Suski (born 11 June 1958, in Grójec) is a Polish conservative politician of the Law and Justice party and theatrical technician. Member of the Sejm of the 4th, 5th, 6th, 7th, 8th, 9th and 10th parliamentary terms, from 2017 to 2019 Head of the Political Cabinet of the Prime Minister of Poland.

== Life ==
Marek Suski was born to parents Janusz and Alina. His paternal ancestors were bearers of the Pomian coat of arms. He is a graduate of the Post-Secondary Vocational School of Theatre Techniques in Warsaw. Initially, he was employed at the Grand Theatre in Warsaw for a year, and subsequently worked in a craftsmen's shop until the early 1990s. From 1993 to 1996, he served as the manager of the Regional Cultural Centre in Tarczyn. His professional trajectory continued as he took on the role of director at a branch of Jarosław Kaczyński's MP office in Radom from 1997 to 1999, after which he joined the joint-stock company "Srebrna."

Suski was a co-founder of the political parties Porozumienie Centrum (PC) and later, Law and Justice. He ran for a parliamentary seat as a PC candidate in 1991 and 1993 but was unsuccessful. Eventually he was elected from the Law and Justice list in the 2001 and 2005 elections. During the 5th Sejm, he chaired the Rules and Parliamentary Affairs Committee starting 3 November 2005, and was a member of the State Treasury Committee, among other special committees. In 2006, he was honored as an honorary member of the World Union of Home Army Soldiers. Despite challenges, he secured a parliamentary seat in the 2007 elections, receiving 29,497 votes in the Radom district. However, in 2008, he was removed from the position of Vice-Chairman of the Rules of Procedure and Parliamentary Affairs Committee following disciplinary action by the Parliamentary Ethics Committee.

Suski successfully ran for re-election to the Sejm in 2011, with 17,251 votes, and again in 2015, receiving 36,542 votes. On 22 July 2016, he was appointed vice-chairman of the commission of inquiry into Amber Gold. On 19 December 2017, Prime Minister Mateusz Morawiecki appointed him as Head of the Political Cabinet of the Prime Minister, with the rank of Secretary of State at the Chancellery of the Prime Minister, succeeding Elżbieta Witek. He won a ninth-term parliamentary seat in the 2019 elections with 69,141 votes. In November 2019, he became vice-chairman of the Law and Justice Parliamentary Club and took leadership roles in the Energy and Treasury Committee and the Culture and Media Committee, subsequently ending his governmental role.

In 2021, Suski was appointed chairman of the Polish Radio Programme Council and became a member of the Council of Political Advisers established by Prime Minister Morawiecki. In the 2023 elections, he retained his parliamentary seat, receiving 37,853 votes. In the 10th Sejm, he was elected chairman of the Committee on Energy, Climate and State Assets.

In April 2024, Gazeta Wyborcza announced that Pegasus was used against Suski.

== See also ==
- Members of Polish Sejm 2005-2007
