= Grojec =

Grojec or Grójec may refer to:

- Grojec, Chrzanów County in Lesser Poland Voivodeship (south Poland)
- Grójec, a town in Masovian Voivodeship (east-central Poland)
- Grójec, Greater Poland Voivodeship (west-central Poland)
- Grojec, Oświęcim County, a village in Lesser Poland Voivodeship, (south Poland)
- Grójec, Przasnysz County in Masovian Voivodeship (east-central Poland)
- Grójec, Świętokrzyskie Voivodeship (south-central Poland)
- Grojec, Silesian Voivodeship (south Poland)
