= Wólka Załęska, Grójec County =

Wólka Załęska
- Village
- Location within Poland
- Coordinates: 51°55′06″N 20°42′03″E
- Country: Poland
- Voivodeship: Masovian
- County: Grójec
- Gmina: Pniewy

Wólka Załęska [ˈvulka zaˈwɛ̃ska] is a village in the administrative district of Gmina Pniewy, within Grójec County, Masovian Voivodeship, in east-central Poland.
