= Goszczyn =

- Village
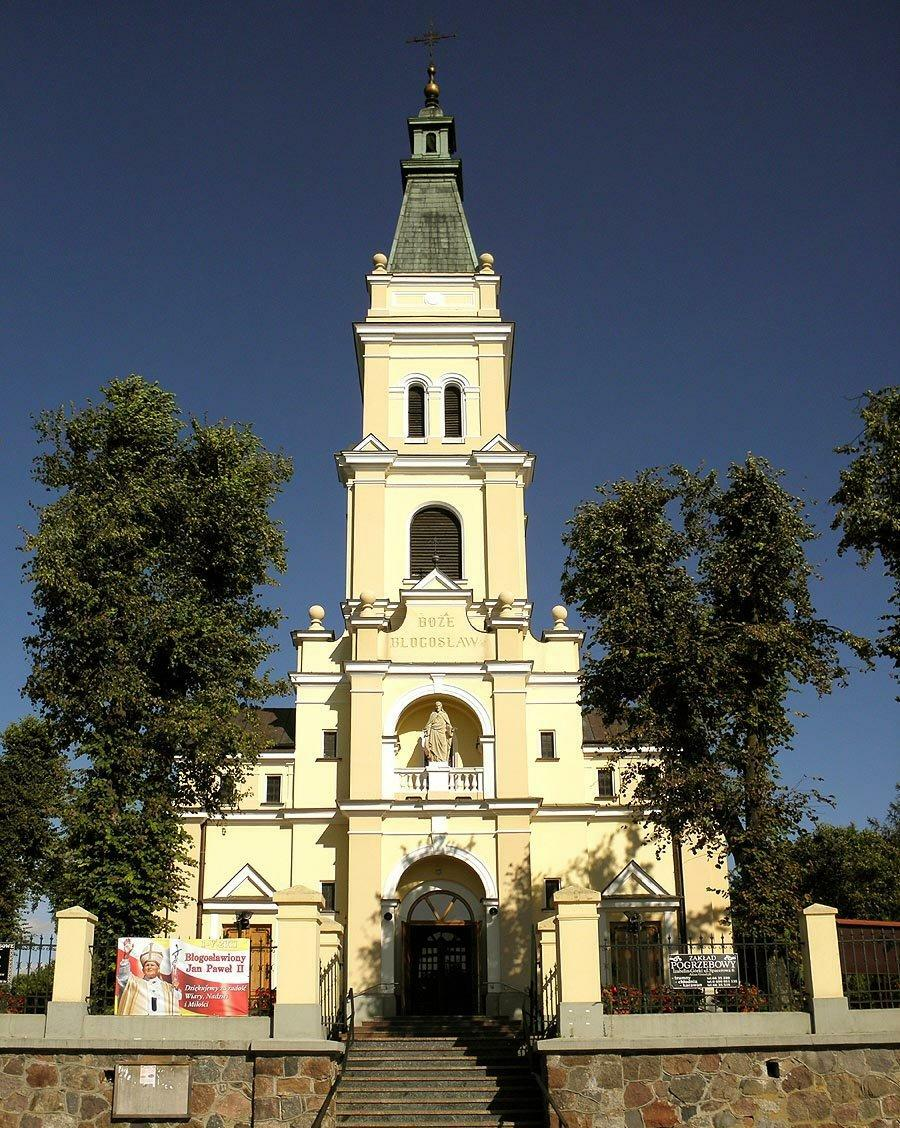
- St. Michael church in Goszczyn

- Coat of arms

- Location within Poland
- Coordinates: 51°43′49″N 20°51′12″E
- Country: Poland
- Voivodeship: Masovian
- County: Grójec
- Gmina: Goszczyn

Population
  - Total: 920
- Time zone: UTC+1 (CET)
  - Summer (DST): UTC+2 (CEST)
- Vehicle registration: WGR

Goszczyn [ˈɡɔʂt͡ʂɨn] is a village in Grójec County, Masovian Voivodeship, in east-central Poland. It is the seat of the gmina (administrative district) called Gmina Goszczyn.
