= Józefów, Gmina Pniewy =

Józefów
- Village
- Location within Poland
- Coordinates: 51°54′39″N 20°41′12″E
- Country: Poland
- Voivodeship: Masovian
- County: Grójec
- Gmina: Pniewy
- Elevation: 184 m (604 ft)
- Population: 70

Józefów (Polish pronunciation: [juˈzɛfuf]) is a village in the administrative district of Gmina Pniewy, within Grójec County, Masovian Voivodeship, in east-central Poland.
