= Pniewy, Masovian Voivodeship =

Pniewy
- Village
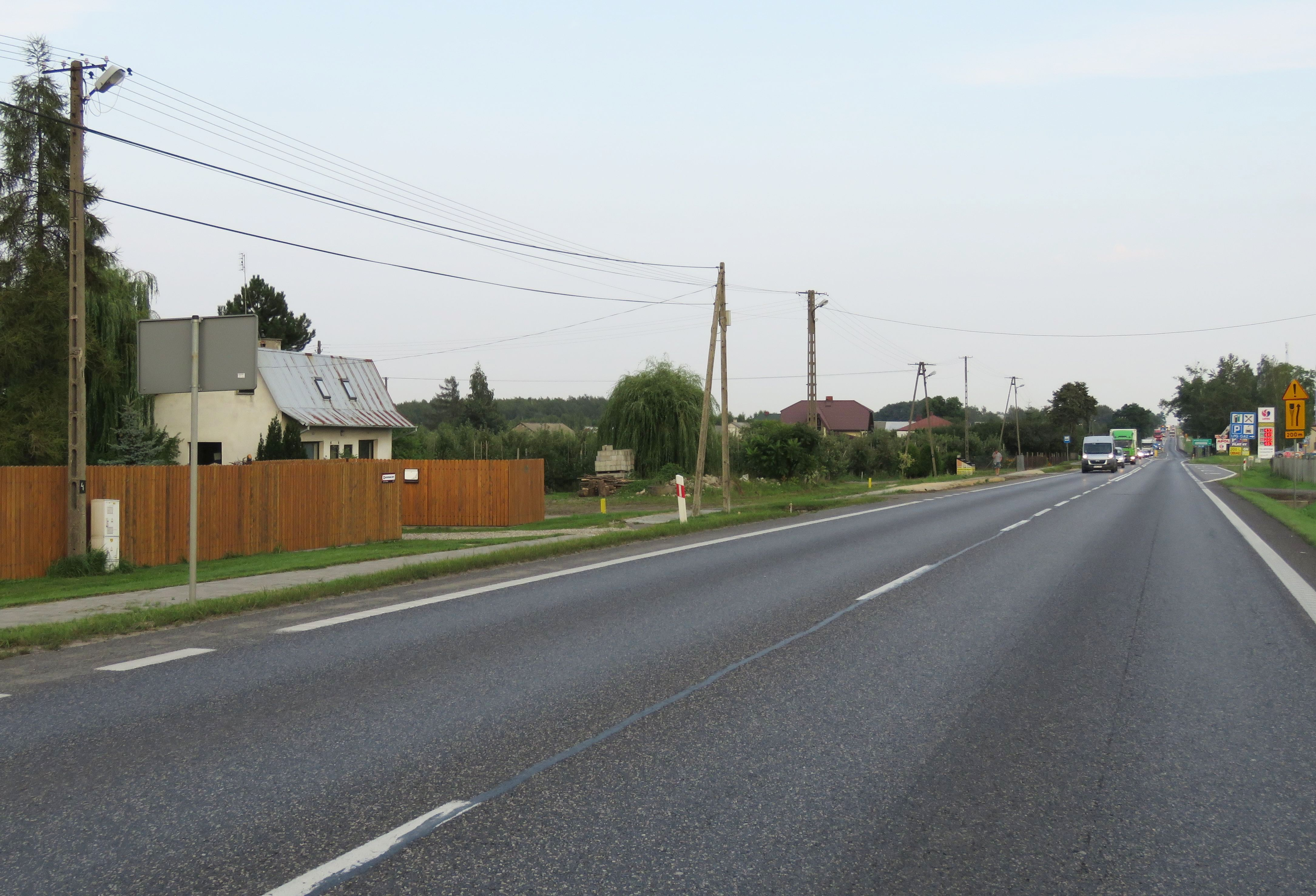

- Location within Poland
- Coordinates: 51°55′N 20°44′E
- Country: Poland
- Voivodeship: Masovian
- County: Grójec
- Gmina: Pniewy
- Time zone: UTC+1 (CET)
  - Summer (DST): UTC+2 (CEST)
- Vehicle registration: WGR

Pniewy [ˈpɲɛvɨ] is a village in Grójec County, Masovian Voivodeship, in east-central Poland. It is the seat of the gmina (administrative district) called Gmina Pniewy.
