= Jurki, Masovian Voivodeship =

Jurki
- Village
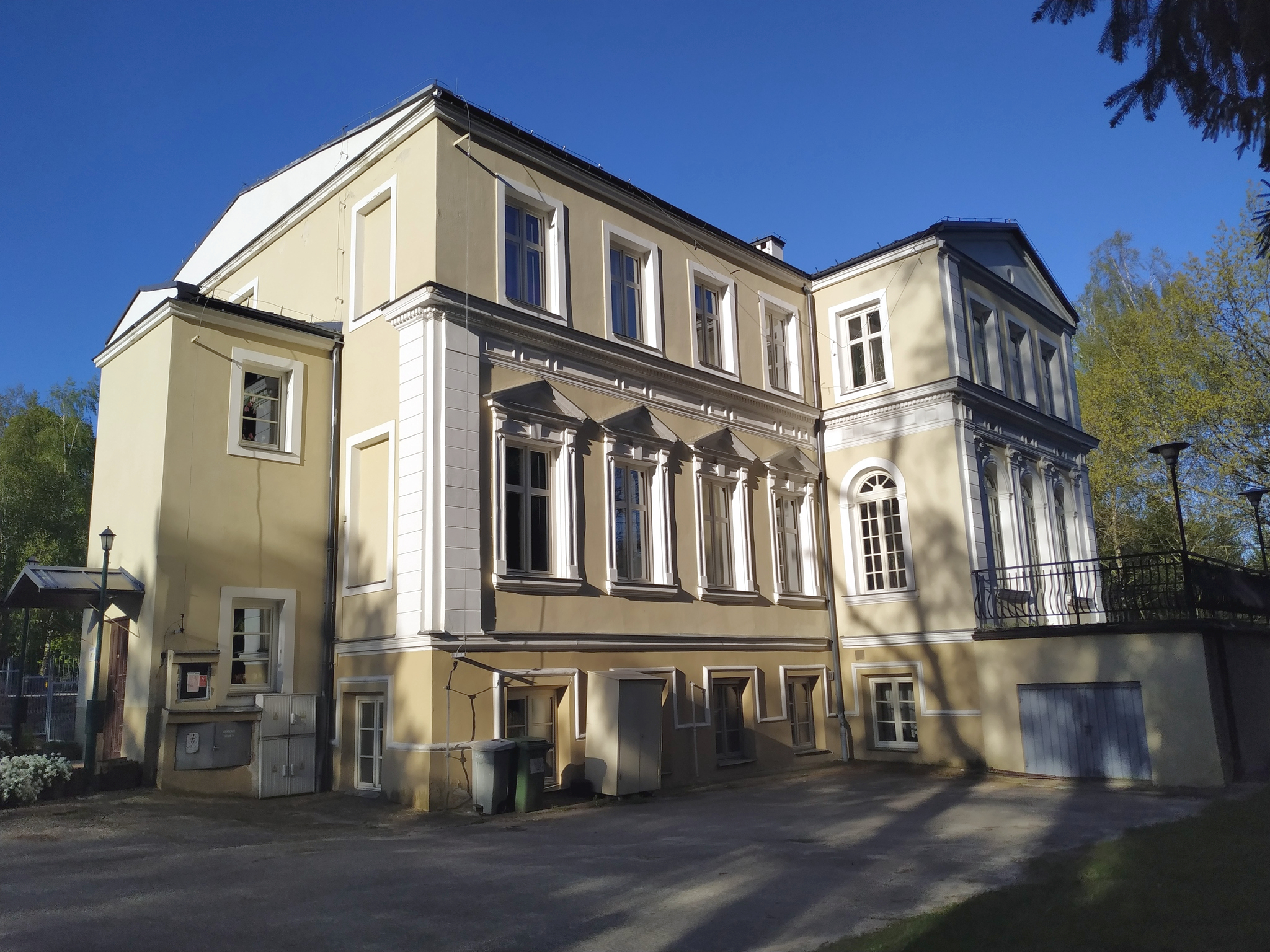
- Jurki Manor

- Location within Poland
- Coordinates: 51°55′N 20°46′E
- Country: Poland
- Voivodeship: Masovian
- County: Grójec
- Gmina: Pniewy
- Postal code: 05-632

Jurki [ˈjurki] is a village in the administrative district of Gmina Pniewy, within Grójec County, Masovian Voivodeship, in east-central Poland.
