= Bartłomiej Niedziela =

Polish footballer

Personal information
- Full name: Bartłomiej Niedziela
- Date of birth: 7 May 1985 (age 41)
- Place of birth: Grójec, Poland
- Height: 1.75 m (5 ft 9 in)
- Position: Midfielder

Team information
- Current team: LKS Promna II
- Number: 16

Senior career*
Years	Team	Apps	(Gls)
- Pilica Białobrzegi
2003–2004	Polonia Warsaw II		
2004–2006	Pilica Białobrzegi		
2006–2007	Ruch Wysokie Mazowieckie		
2007–2010	Jagiellonia Białystok	22	(0)
2009	→ Motor Lublin (loan)	8	(0)
2009–2010	→ Górnik Łęczna (loan)	26	(4)
2010–2011	Flota Świnoujście	31	(1)
2011–2012	Arka Gdynia	18	(0)
2012–2013	Flota Świnoujście	27	(3)
2013–2014	Górnik Łęczna	28	(1)
2014–2017	Chojniczanka Chojnice	71	(5)
2017–2019	Widzew Łódź	12	(0)
2019–2020	Stomil Olsztyn	20	(0)
2020–2023	Pilica Białobrzegi	71	(6)
2020–2023	Syrenka Soccer School	12	(8)
2024–	LKS Promna	11	(5)
- * Club domestic league appearances and goals as of 21 December 2024

Bartłomiej Niedziela (born 7 May 1985) is a Polish footballer who plays as a midfielder for LKS Promna II.

== Career ==
In July 2011, he joined Arka Gdynia on a one-year contract. Following his contract with Gdynia ended in June 2012, he rejoined his former team Flota Świnoujście on a one-year contract.

== Honours ==
Widzew Łódź

- III liga, group I: 2017–18

Pilica Białobrzegi

- IV liga Masovia (Radom-Siedlce): 2020–21
- Polish Cup (Radom regionals): 2020–21
