= Józefów Massacre =

Mass murder of Polish Jews by German occupiers

Coordinates: 50°29′N 23°03′E

Józefów Massacre refers to the mass murder of Polish Jewish inhabitants of Józefów Biłgorajski carried out by German occupiers on 13 July 1942. On Winiarczykowa Góra near Józefów, officers of the 101st Reserve Police Battalion (Reserve-Polizei-Bataillon 101) shot 1,300 to 1,500 Jews. Most of the victims were women, children and the elderly.

== The massacre ==
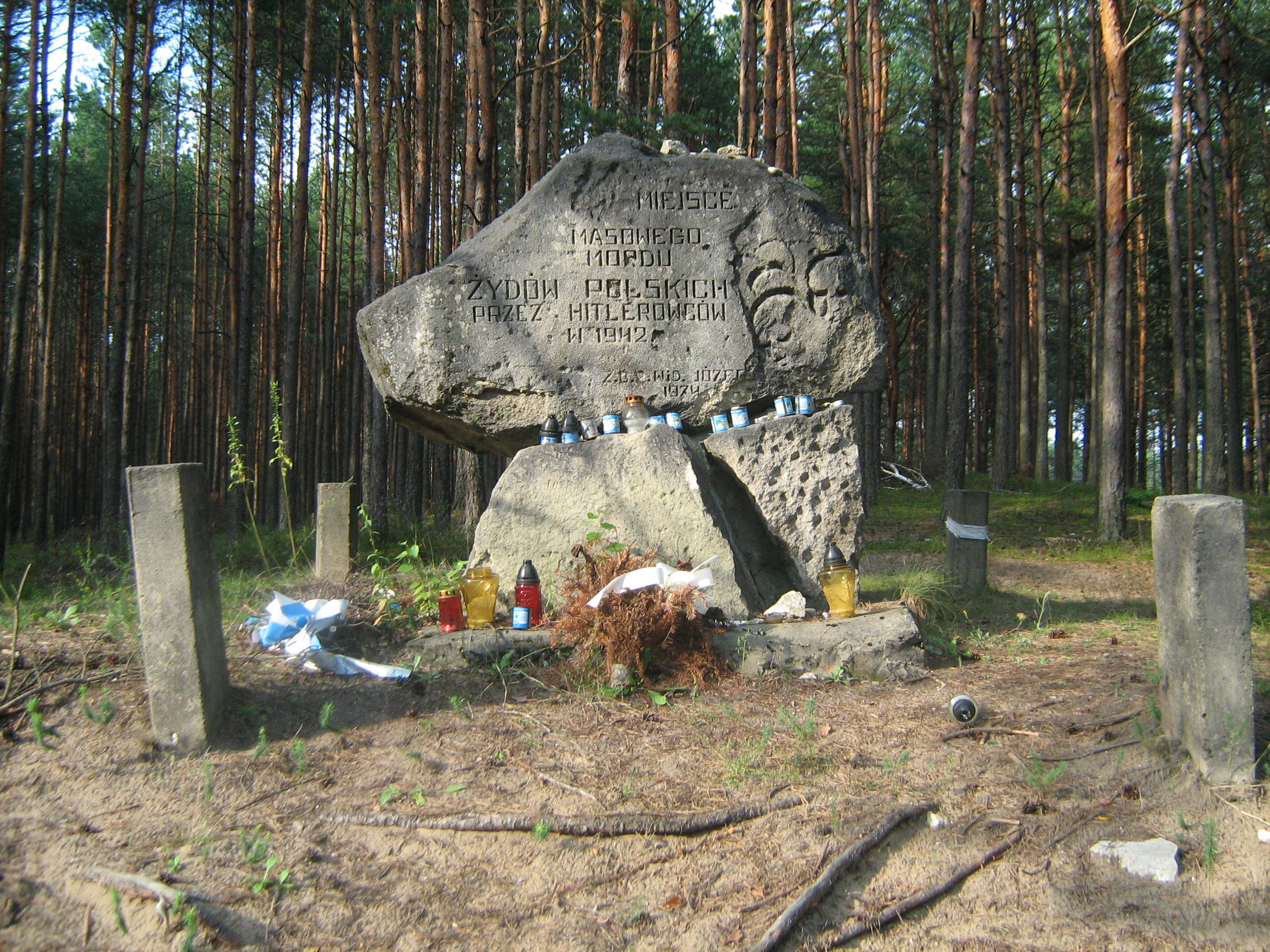
Monument in Józefów erected in 1974 to commemorate the 1942 massacre of its Jewish population by the Germans

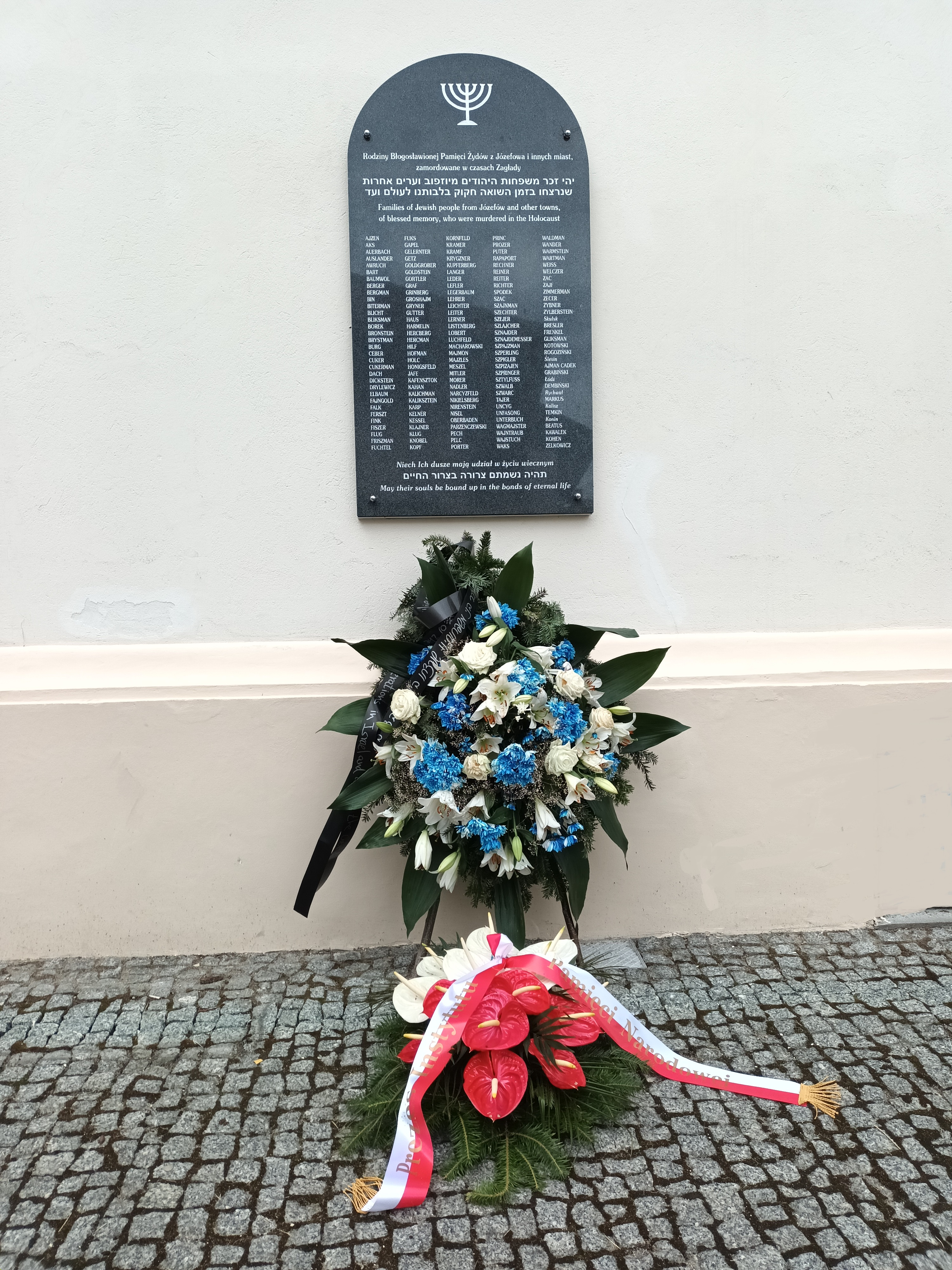
Plaque at the wall of the synagogue in Józefów with the names of the identified victims of massacre

Before the massacre, Józefów was a typical, relatively large village in Eastern Poland located twenty miles southeast of Biłgoraj. It had a large Jewish population numbering around 2,800 Jews. The substantial Jewish sector originated with the founding of the town in the early 18th century. Traditionally, the town was fairly poor and provincial with a large population of orthodox Jews.

During the 1939 invasions of Poland by Germany and the Soviet Union, Józefów was bombed by the German Luftwaffe, and subsequently occupied by first the German and then the Red Army for a few days. The Soviet occupation was short-lived, however as many as 1,000 Jews left the town during this time, mostly those with the means and relations to relocate to other areas, especially the Soviet Union. The area became part of the Nazi's General Government, and those remaining in Józefów continued living relatively normal lives, governed by the Jewish Committee or Judenrat. In 1941, an influx of 1,100 poor Jews were relocated to Józefów from Konin. As a result, conditions in the already struggling town deteriorated. There was not enough food or housing for the growing Jewish population and the Nazi presence became harder to ignore. There were also growing health concerns as Józefów become a hot spot for the typhus epidemic in Biłgoraj County in 1941 and 1942. There were no doctors remaining in the town to tend to the sick and deaths from typhus were common.

The Józefów Massacre was carried out by the men of Nazi German Reserve Police Battalion 101, led by Major Wilhelm Trapp (“Papa Trapp”). The battalion had eleven officers, five administrators and 486 men. The servicemen of Police Battalion 101 were not dedicated Nazis, but ordinary Germans from Hamburg and the surrounding region. They were primarily Evangelical Protestants and most were older men with wives and families of their own. The average age in the battalion was thirty-nine, meaning most had grown up and experienced life before the rise of Hitler and Nazism. These men were also mostly from the working class, dock workers and truck drivers, but some were lower-middle class or skilled laborers. Few had been educated beyond the age of fifteen. The fact that these men were only police battalion members, and had not volunteered for the SS or Gestapo duty indicates that they were not particularly strong advocates of Nazism. By 1942 only 25% were members of the Nazi Party.

On July 12, the day before the massacre was to take place, Major Trapp relayed the orders to the officers. A reserve Lieutenant in the 1st Company declared himself unfit for the task. Instead, he was reassigned to transport Jews to work in Lublin. Sometime between the hours of midnight and 2 a.m., the battalion left for Józefów. When they arrived, Major Trapp delivered the order calling for the mass extermination of the village's Jews. One witness recalled,

He announced that in the locality before us we were to carry out a mass killing by shooting and he brought out clearly that those whom we were supposed to shoot were Jews. During his address he bid us to think of our women and children in our homeland who had to endure aerial bombardments. In particular, we were supposed to bear in mind that many women and children lose their lives in these attacks. Thinking of these facts would make it easier for us to carry out the order during the upcoming [killing] action. Major Trapp remarked that the action was entirely not in his spirit, but that he had received this order from higher authority.

It is unclear whether referencing German women and children was meant to encourage or deter the men from fulfilling their duties. Regardless, Trapp then requested that any man who did not feel up to the task should step forward. Between ten and twelve men opted out and were reassigned to guard or transport duties.

First, the Jews were driven out of their homes and rounded up in the market place. Any Jew who resisted, hid, or was unable to make it to the market was ordered to be shot on the spot. Around 10 a.m, all the young men who were deemed fit to work were separated and the group (about 400) was sent to work in Lublin. During part of the selection process, the 1st Company gathered in a semi-circle around Dr. Schoenfelder where the battalion's physician proceeded to instruct the men to shoot their victims in the back of the neck. Then the remaining Jews were loaded into trucks and driven to the nearby forest. Each member of the firing squad was paired with a Jewish man, woman, or child. Together, members of the 1st Company and Jews marched into a clearing and executions were carried out after a squad leader issued the order. By noon, the 1st Company was joined by the 2nd Company and by the end of the day they had murdered between 1,200 and 1,500 Jews. The battalion left the corpses in the forest and the responsibility for their burial fell to the mayor of Józefów.

=== Monographs ===
Two historians have written in detail of the March 1942 Józefów Massacre: Christopher Browning and Daniel Goldhagen.

In 1992, Browning wrote Ordinary Men: Reserve Police Battalion 101 and the Final Solution in Poland, which is an expanded work of his essay, "One Day in Józefów: Initiation to Mass Murder." This essay seeks to prove that the men of Police Battalion 101 did not follow through with the execution out of fear of being punished by their leader, but rather they committed these horrible acts on their own accord. Browning argues that these men "were certainly not a group carefully selected for their suitability as mass murderers, nor were they given special training and indoctrination for the task that awaited them." Although they were given the option to not take part, the large majority of the unit were able to shoot a combined total of over a thousand Jewish men, women and children in a single day. "Like any other unit, Reserve Police Battalion 101 killed the Jews they had been told to kill."

Browning's work relies on German documents rather than obtaining testimony from non-Jews living in the area of Józefów or from survivors of the massacre. It does not answer the question of why were ordinary men willing to slaughter so many innocent people if they were not facing punishment for not complying with orders, although he includes some testimony from officers claiming that they committed these acts because they were concerned with appearing as a coward and had to keep their careers in mind.

In Daniel Goldhagen's book, Hitler's Willing Executioners: Ordinary Germans and the Holocaust, Goldhagen includes a chapter titled "Police Battalion 101: The Men’s Deeds" in which he details the events of the massacre, providing testimony from officers in the battalion. Goldhagen, too, does not include testimony from non-Jewish citizens who were living in the area at the time or from survivors. However, he does focus on Major Trapp's orders more specifically than Browning and asserts that a highly emotional Trapp supposedly exclaimed, “My God, why must I do this.” Through detailing the individual orders and meetings that Trapp and the men participated in, Goldhagen is clear that Police Battalion 101 was fully aware of the circumstances and brutality of the situation they were about to embark upon and that all men in the battalion did have the option to not participate in the killing. He goes on to spend a large section of the chapter outlining the way in which the massacre was carried out and the sheer brutality of the killings. “The executioners were gruesomely soiled with blood, brain matter, and bone splinters. It stuck to their clothes.” Goldhagen includes information on how the men reacted immediately after the slaughter in addition to their sentiments in the post-war years. Many men quickly took to drinking to numb their horror, while others argued about who killed the most Jews and how they could have killed more effectively. Goldhagen proves that despite their "having had the opportunity to extricate themselves from the killing, from the grisly, disgusting duty, almost all of them chose to carry out their lethal tasks."

=== After the massacre ===
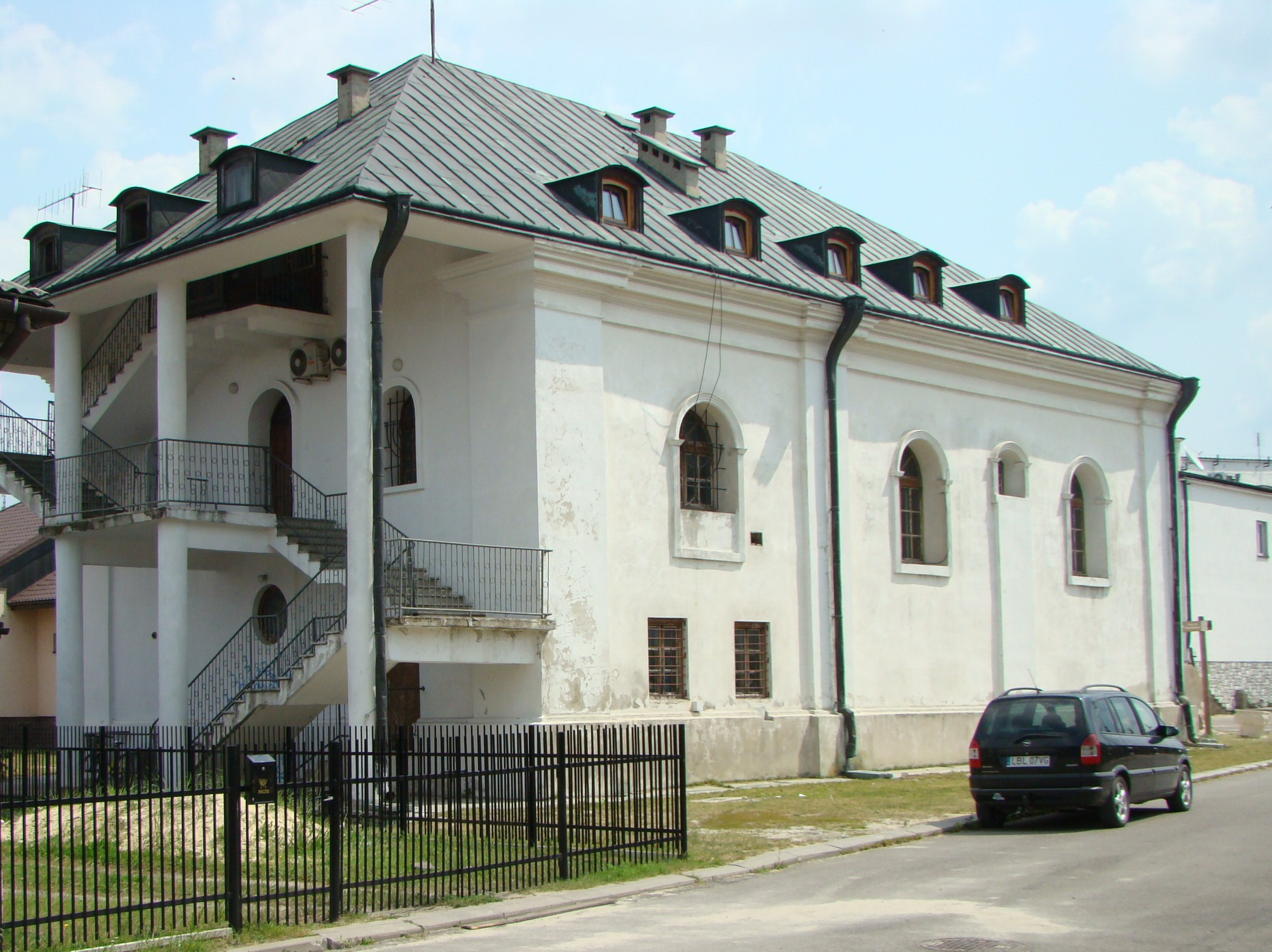
Józefów former synagogue, now a heritage library, 2013.

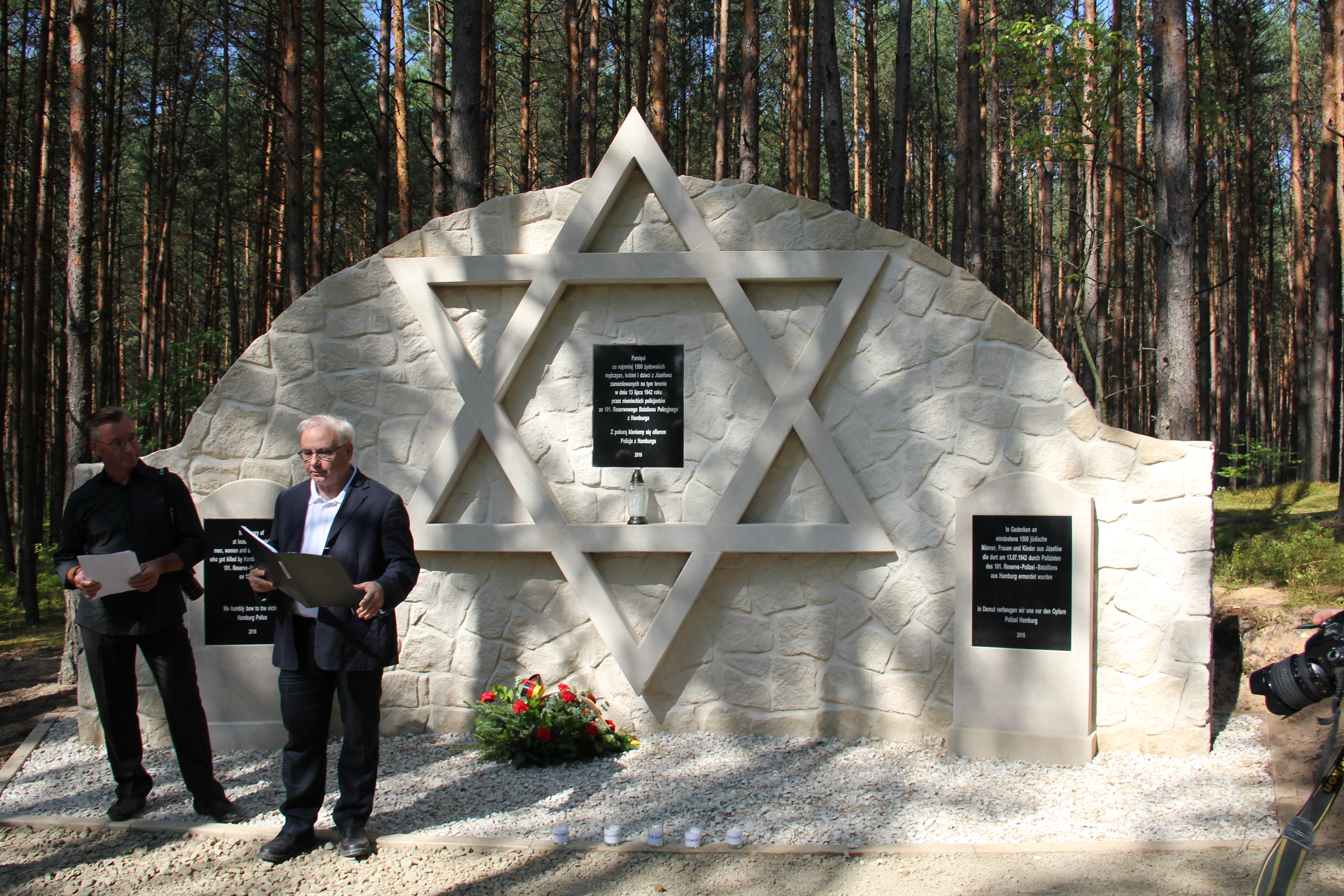
New memorial, erected in 2016

The aftermath of the Józefów massacre includes consequences for the Jewish population, the men of Reserve Police Battalion 101, and the current state of the town. In total, 1,500 men, women, and children died as a result of the massacre, which was the great majority of the Jewish population of 1,800 and a significant percentage of the total population of the town. However, some Jews did manage to escape the shootings and return. One source estimates that 200 to 300 Jews survived the Józefów massacre by hiding in homes, city buildings, and the forest. Many of the survivors came back to their town. Jews from surrounding towns were also relocated to Józefów. The remaining Jewish population was subsequently killed in the September and November 1942 deportation actions. The town was then proclaimed to be Judenfrei: free of Jews. Meanwhile, two members of the Mart family from the German minority residing in Józefów were shot by Polish underground resistance fighters thereafter for cooperation with the enemy.

For their part, the men of Reserve Police Battalion 101 had some consequences for their actions. The psychological effects of Józefów were apparent in all the men. The members of the Battalion did not speak directly after the massacre. Many would not speak of Józefów many years after 1942. The personal responsibility of killing Jews at point-blank range affected the men. Browning notes that many Battalion members could speak of participating in other genocidal measures, such as loading Jews onto trains for concentration camps, because they felt detachment from the actual murder. The psychological differences between methods of murder reflected the larger reasoning behind the Nazi use of gas chambers. Einsatzgruppen, mobile SS death squads, used guns as their primary means of killing Jews. However, Nazi authorities noticed the physical and mental effects of shooting on groups such as Reserve Police Battalion 101. Nazis were also concerned with the sheer inefficiency of gun use for mass killing. Thus, gas chambers were later established as the principal means of killing the Jewish population.

After the Second World War, the majority of Reserve Police Battalion 101's members returned to their working and middle class jobs. Some of the men, including men who chose not to participate in the shooting at the Józefów Massacre, were promoted to jobs with the police. It was not until a few or even many years after the war that the actions committed during the Józefów Massacre were investigated. Major Trapp, the leader of the unit, and three other men were brought to Poland for trial in 1947, and executed for murder of 74 Polish citizens. The killing of Jews was not mentioned in their trial. The massacre itself was not investigated until 1962, when Hamburg authorities interviewed 210 members of Reserve Police Battalion 101 about their involvement. From these interviews, 14 men were found guilty of war crimes, but ultimately only three men served prison time as a result of their actions.

== Commemoration ==
The town of Józefów currently has several reminders of the former Jewish population. The synagogue, originally dating from the 18th century, is now used as a public library and a hostel. The Jewish Cemetery, dating back to the early 18th century, was partially destroyed during World War II and from the lack of care and upkeep. However, the Jewish Cemetery and the Synagogue were restored in an effort to remember the Jewish population of Józefów. In 1975, a memorial was built on the outskirts of the town to mark the mass grave from the massacre and to commemorate the town's perished Jews. Although there are remnants and memorials remembering former Jewish life in Józefów, there is no longer an active Jewish population. One converted Jewish resident was recorded as living there in 2007.
