= Grójec =

Town in Masovian Voivodeship, Poland

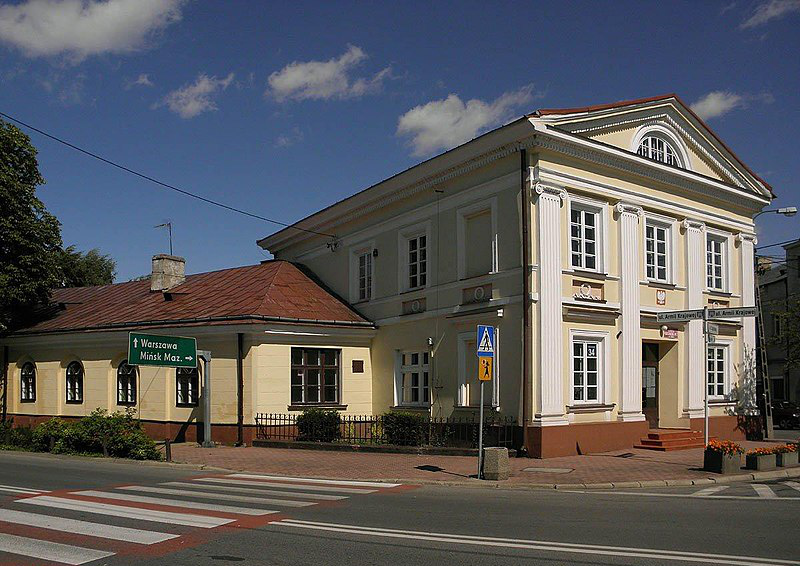
- Historical architecture in the town centre

- Coat of arms

- Location within Poland
- Coordinates: 51°51′56″N 20°52′3″E
- Country: Poland
- Voivodeship: Masovian
- County: Grójec
- Gmina: Grójec
- Established: 11th century
- Town rights: 1419

Government
  - Mayor: Dariusz Gwiazda

Area
  - Total: 8.52 km^{2} (3.29 sq mi)
- Elevation: 153 m (502 ft)

Population (2017)
  - Total: 16,674
  - Density: 1,960/km^{2} (5,070/sq mi)
- Time zone: UTC+1 (CET)
  - Summer (DST): UTC+2 (CEST)
- Postal code: 05-600
- Area code: +48 48
- Car plates: WGR
- Website: https://www.grojecmiasto.pl/

Grójec [ˈɡrujɛt͡s] is a town in east-central Poland, located in the Masovian Voivodeship, about 40 kilometres (25 miles) south of Warsaw. It is the capital of the urban-rural administrative district Grójec and Grójec County. It has 16,674 inhabitants (2017). Grójec surroundings are considered to be the biggest apple-growing area of Poland. It is said that the region makes up also for the biggest apple orchard of Europe. Statistically, every third apple sold in Poland is grown in the Grójec area – a unique local microclimate provides for their beautiful red colour.

== History ==
In the 11th and 12th centuries, Grójec was the seat of a castellany, which was then moved to Czersk. It was granted town rights in 1419 by Duke Janusz I of Warsaw from the Piast dynasty. In the early modern period, a trade route connecting Warsaw and Kraków ran through the town. It was one of the busiest routes in Poland.

=== World War II ===
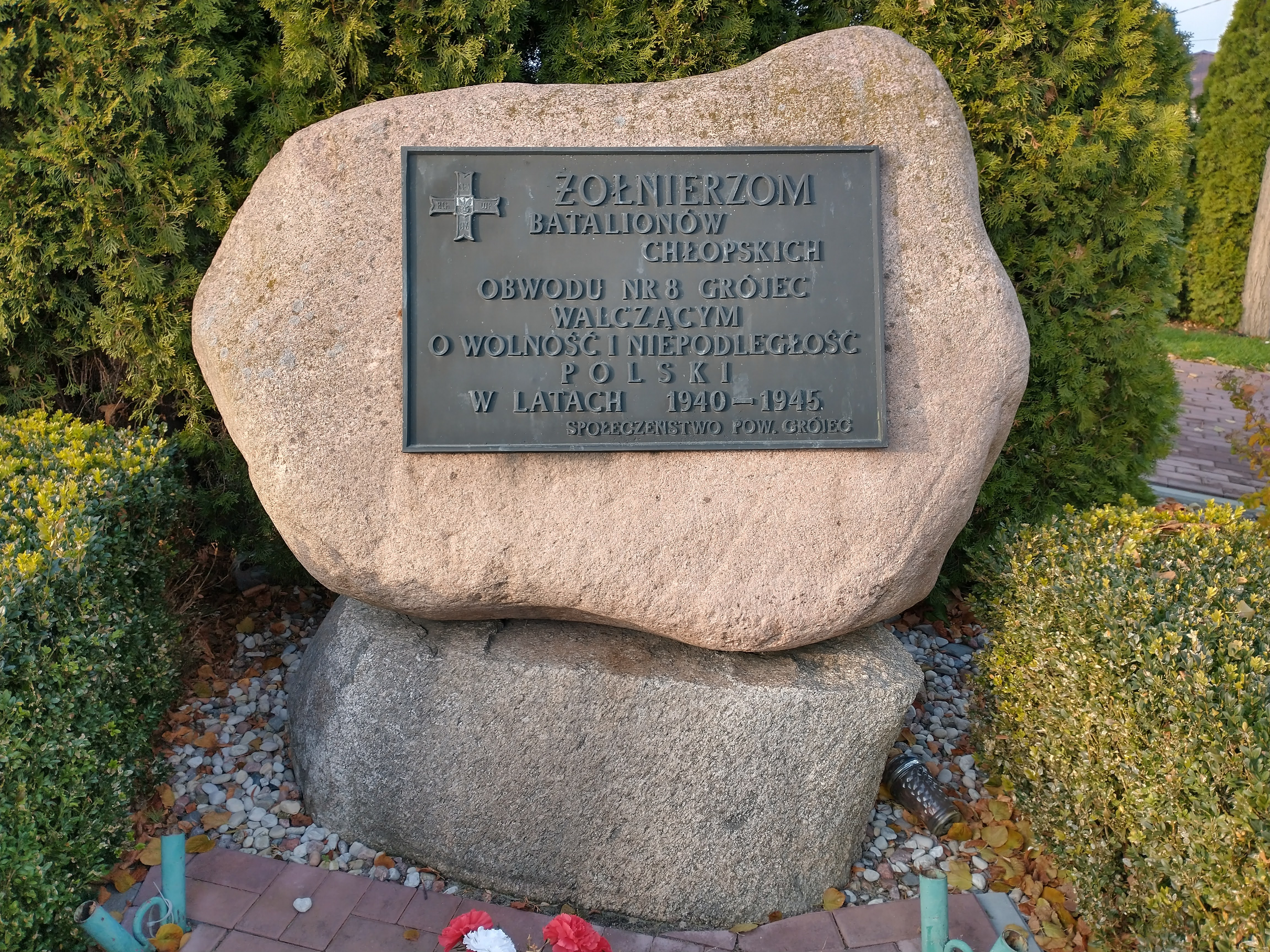
Memorial to local partisans of the Peasant Battalions

In September 1939, during the joint German-Soviet invasion of Poland which started World War II, the town was bombed by the Luftwaffe and afterwards captured by Germany. Over 20 Poles who were either born, educated or lived and worked in Grójec were murdered by the Russians in the Katyn massacre in 1940. In November 1940, during the Nazi occupation of Poland, German authorities established a Jewish ghetto in Grójec, in order to confine its Jewish population for the purpose of persecution and exploitation. The ghetto was liquidated in February 1941, when almost all of its inhabitants (5,200–6,000) were transported on trains used for cattle to Warsaw Ghetto, the largest ghetto in all of German-occupied Europe with over 400,000 Jews crammed into an area of 1.3 square miles (3.4 km^{2}). From there, most inmates were sent to Treblinka extermination camp. Only a group of Jewish craftsmen was left in Grójec, however, they were also annihilated in a mass execution in Dębówka, near Góra Kalwaria. German occupation of Grójec ended in January 1945.

== Demographics ==
Historical population

Year	Pop.	±%
1897	6,028	—
1910	6,073	+0.7%
1921	8,375	+37.9%
1931	9,518	+13.6%

Year	Pop.	±%
1939	10,430	+9.6%
1950	7,514	−28.0%
1960	8,611	+14.6%
2010	15,533	+80.4%

== Nature ==
=== Forest Inspectorate Reserves ===
There are nine nature reserves in the Grójec Forest Inspectorate, whose total area exceeds 1 thousand hectares.

The following are forest reserves that cover a part of the forested area: Dąbrowa Radziejowska, a 52.50 hectare reserve in a large forest complex in the Radziejowice commune, was created in 1984 to preserve and protect luminous oak wood; Osuchowskie Grądy, a 99,25 hectare reserve was established in 1982 and is at the highest point of the Mazowiecka lowland; Skulski Las, a 311.75 hectare partial forest reserve established in 1984 and includes most of the Skuły Wschód range, situated in the Skuły-Wschód forestry unit; and Skulskie Oaks, a 30,07 hectare partial forest reserve of the area of established in 1996, covering the north-western part of the Skuły-Western range and belonging to the Grójec Forest Inspectorate.

The Łęgacz Nad Jeziorka 37.31 hectare reserve is situated by the Jeziorka River, several hundred meters to the north-west of Głuchów village. The protected area covers a fragment of the river valley and a riparian forest growing on its right bank and marshy bottom of the valley.

The Lakes of Olszyna nature reserve was established by the Ministry of the Environment on 25 January 1995. The forest reserve is in the southern part of the lake district on the Jeziorka River and has a total area is 5.83 hectares, including 4.99 hectares of forest.

The Modrzewina forest reserve was established in 1959 on the grounds of the village of Mała Wieś in the commune of Belsk Duży to protect the northernmost site of Polish larch in the Highland, which grow in this area to a height of 40 meters and up to 120 cm in circumference.

Tomczyce is a landscape reserve of 57.99 hectare, established in 1968, located between the villages of Gostomia and Tomczyce to the east of Nowe Miasto. The reserve protects the steep slope of the Pilica valley, cut by several ravines and overgrown by an old pine–oak forest. The valley slopes from a height of 20 meters to the river, which remains steep due to erosion of the riverbank, running along the foot of the slope and undercutting it periodically.

The Sokół forest reserve was established in 1995 in the commune of Wyśmierzyce to protect the area of forests, meadows and marshes and preserve the plant complexes with the dominant mountain ash for scientific and educational purposes.

Within the territorial range of Grójec Forest Inspectorate there are four Landscape Protection Areas along the picturesque and ecologically important river valleys, namely, the Jeziorka River Valley, Pilica and Drzewiczka River Valley; Bolimowsko Radziejowicki with the Central Rawka River Valley and the Chojnatka River Valley.

== Sports ==
The local football team is Mazowsze Grójec. It competes in the lower leagues.

== Notable people ==
- Piotr Skarga (1536–1612), Polish Jesuit, preacher, hagiographer and polemicist.
- Asher Rabinowicz of Przedbórz (ca.1720–1798) an 18th-century Hasidic Maggid (preacher).
- Jan Jagmin-Sadowski (1895–1977), a general of the Polish Army
- Marek Suski (born 1958), a Polish politician
- Justyna Kozdryk (born 1980, a Polish Paralympic powerlifter
- Bartłomiej Niedziela (born 1985), a Polish footballer with over 250 club caps

== International relations ==
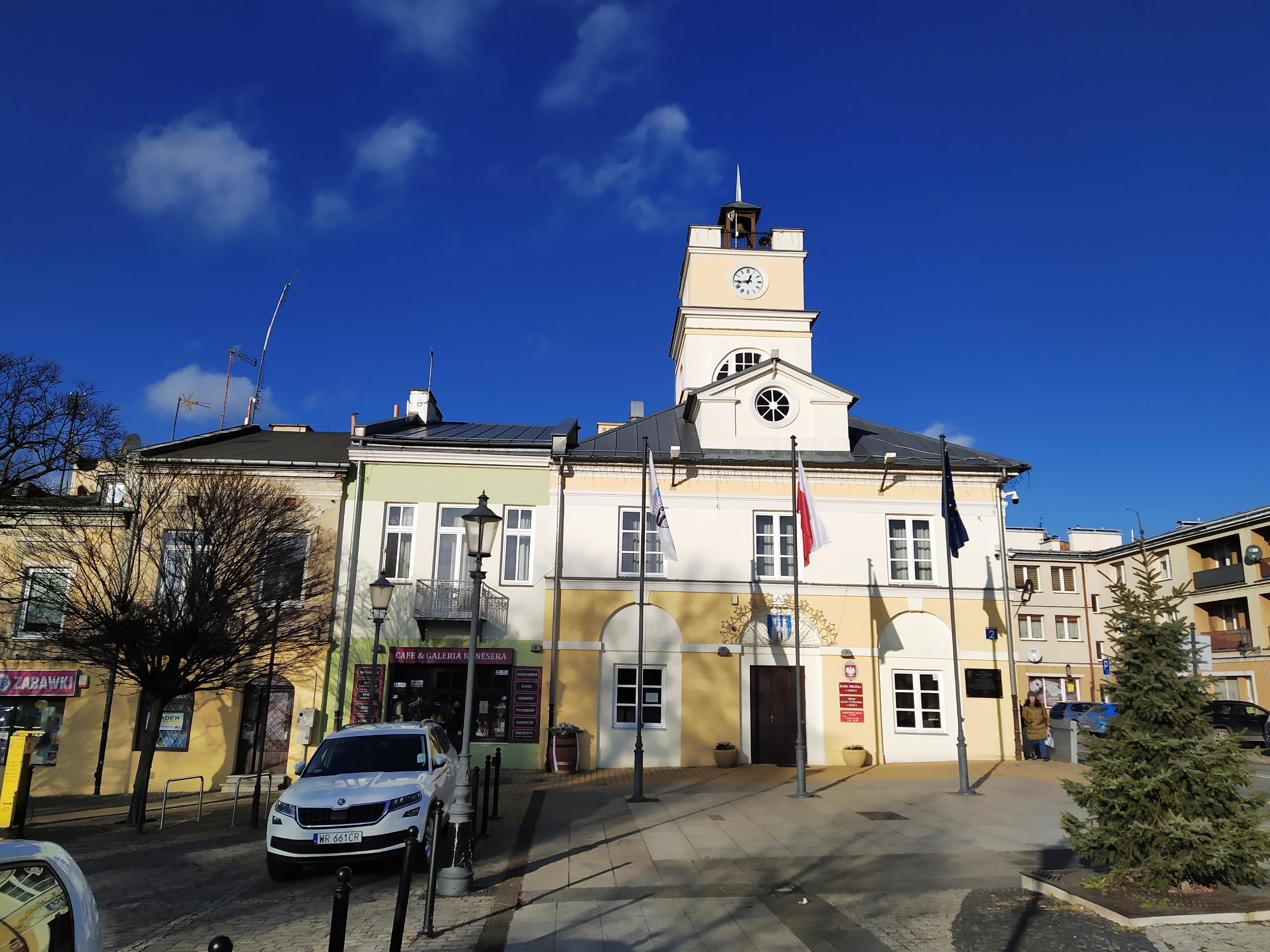
Town hall

=== Twin towns – Sister cities ===
Grójec is twinned with:

- Spišská Nová Ves, Slovakia
- Strumica, North Macedonia
- Canosa di Puglia, Italy
- Horki, Belarus

== See also ==
- Grojec (disambiguation)

== Notes and references ==
- Grójec city government webpage
- Jewish Community in Grójec on Virtual Shtetl
