= Józefków =

Józefków may refer to the following places:

- Józefków, Gmina Gostynin in Masovian Voivodeship (east-central Poland)
- Józefków, Gmina Szczawin Kościelny in Masovian Voivodeship (east-central Poland)
- Józefków, Świętokrzyskie Voivodeship (south-central Poland)
- Józefków, Opole Voivodeship (south-west Poland)
