= Rožná =

- Municipality
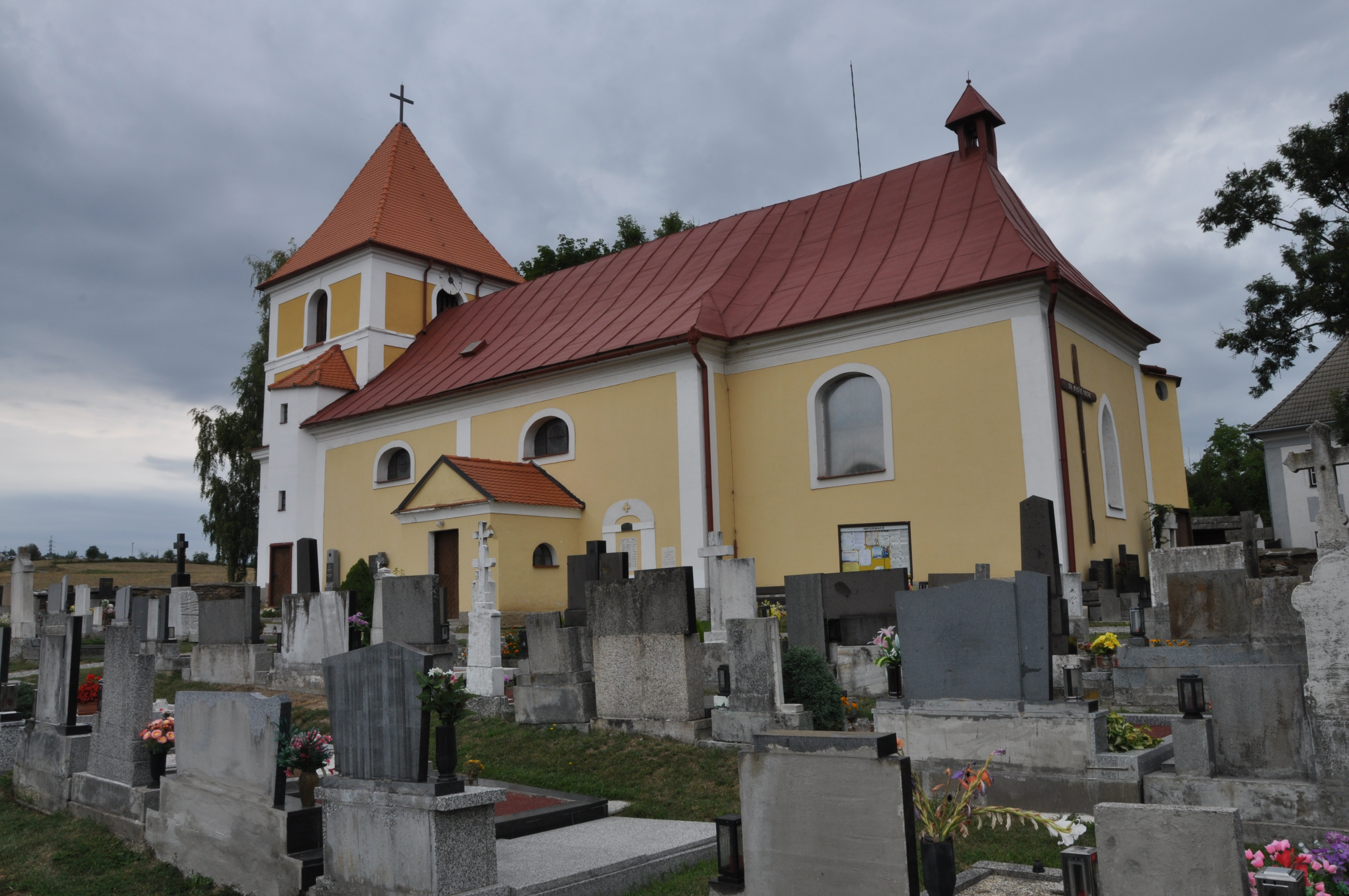
- Church of Saint Gall

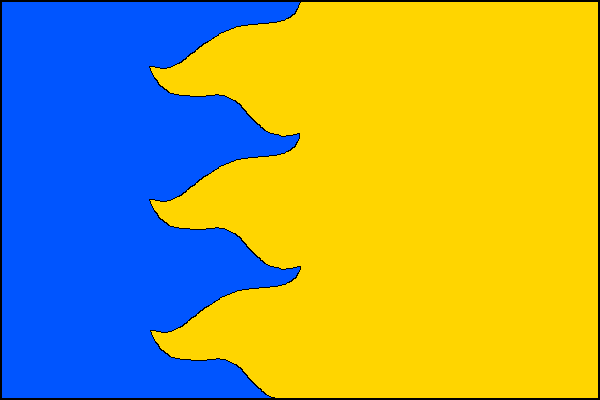
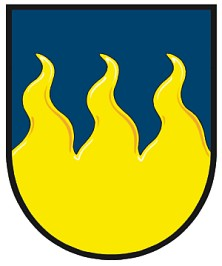
- Flag Coat of arms

- Location in the Czech Republic
- Coordinates: 49°28′38″N 16°14′19″E
- Country: Czech Republic
- Region: Vysočina
- District: Žďár nad Sázavou
- First mentioned: 1349

Area
  - Total: 12.86 km^{2} (4.97 sq mi)
- Elevation: 460 m (1,510 ft)

Population (2026-01-01)
  - Total: 818
  - Density: 63.6/km^{2} (165/sq mi)
- Time zone: UTC+1 (CET)
  - Summer (DST): UTC+2 (CEST)
- Postal codes: 592 52, 593 01
- Website: www.rozna.cz

Rožná is a municipality and village in Žďár nad Sázavou District in the Vysočina Region of the Czech Republic. It has about 800 inhabitants.

Rožná lies approximately 24 kilometres (15 mi) south-east of Žďár nad Sázavou, 48 kilometres (30 mi) east of Jihlava, and 147 kilometres (91 mi) south-east of Prague.

== Administrative division ==
Rožná consists of three municipal parts (in brackets population according to the 2021 census):

- Rožná (528)
- Josefov (68)
- Zlatkov (164)

== Demographics ==
Historical population
Year	Pop.	±%
1869	849	—
1880	825	−2.8%
1890	877	+6.3%
1900	916	+4.4%
1910	932	+1.7%
1921	869	−6.8%
1930	922	+6.1%
1950	808	−12.4%
1961	831	+2.8%
1970	749	−9.9%
1980	735	−1.9%
1991	726	−1.2%
2001	737	+1.5%
2011	765	+3.8%
2021	760	−0.7%
Source: Censuses
