= Grójec County =

Grójec County Powiat grójecki
- County
- Flag Coat of arms

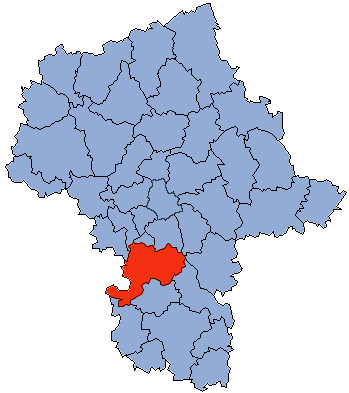
- Location within the voivodeship

- Division into gminas
- Coordinates (Grójec): 51°51′56″N 20°52′3″E
- Country: Poland
- Voivodeship: Masovian
- Seat: Grójec
- Gminas: Total 10: Gmina Belsk Duży; Gmina Błędów; Gmina Chynów; Gmina Goszczyn; Gmina Grójec; Gmina Jasieniec; Gmina Mogielnica; Gmina Nowe Miasto nad Pilicą; Gmina Pniewy; Gmina Warka

Area
  - Total: 1,268.82 km^{2} (489.89 sq mi)

Population (2019)
  - Total: 98,334
  - Density: 77.500/km^{2} (200.72/sq mi)
  - Urban: 34,701
  - Rural: 63,633
- Car plates: WGR
- Website: www.grojec.pl

Grójec County (Polish: powiat grójecki) is a unit of territorial administration and local government (powiat) in Masovian Voivodeship, east-central Poland. It came into being on January 1, 1999, as a result of the Polish local government reforms passed in 1998. Its administrative seat and largest town is Grójec, which lies 40 kilometres (25 mi) south of Warsaw. The county contains three other towns: Warka, 25 km (16 mi) east of Grójec, Nowe Miasto nad Pilicą, 34 km (21 mi) south-west of Grójec, and Mogielnica, 22 km (14 mi) south-west of Grójec.

The county covers an area of 1,268.82 square kilometres (489.9 sq mi). As of 2019 its total population is 98,334, out of which the population of Grójec is 16,745, that of Warka is 11,948, that of Nowe Miasto nad Pilicą is 3,755, that of Mogielnica is 2,253, and the rural population is 63,633.

== Neighbouring counties ==
Grójec County is bordered by Grodzisk County and Piaseczno County to the north, Otwock County to the north-east, Garwolin County and Kozienice County to the east, Białobrzegi County and Przysucha County to the south, Tomaszów County and Rawa County to the west, and Żyrardów County to the north-west.

== Administrative divisions ==
The county is subdivided into 10 gminas (four urban-rural and six rural). These are listed in the following table, in descending order of population.

Gmina	Type	Area (km^{2})	Population (2019)	Seat
Gmina Grójec	urban-rural	120.6	25,769	Grójec
Gmina Warka	urban-rural	201.1	19,262	Warka
Gmina Chynów	rural	137.1	9,837	Chynów
Gmina Mogielnica	urban-rural	141.6	8,710	Mogielnica
Gmina Nowe Miasto nad Pilicą	urban-rural	158.5	7,713	Nowe Miasto nad Pilicą
Gmina Błędów	rural	135.2	7,418	Błędów
Gmina Belsk Duży	rural	107.8	6,502	Belsk Duży
Gmina Jasieniec	rural	107.8	5,366	Jasieniec
Gmina Pniewy	rural	102.1	4,797	Pniewy
Gmina Goszczyn	rural	57.0	2,960	Goszczyn
