= Wanaty massacre =

- Part of Occupation of Poland (1939–1945)
- Location: 51°48′N 21°30′E; Wanaty, Poland
- Date: February 28, 1944
- Target: Village inhabitants
- Attack type: War crime
- Deaths: 108
- Injuries: 2
- Perpetrators: Ordnungspolizei, Schutzstaffel

The Wanaty massacre was a Nazi war crime committed by the Ordnungspolizei and Schutzstaffel in the village of Wanaty, within German-occupied Poland. On February 28, 1944, the village was completely destroyed, and 108 of its inhabitants, primarily women and children, were killed. This massacre was carried out in retaliation against the civilian population following the death of several German gendarmes in a skirmish with Polish partisans near Wanaty a week earlier.

== Prelude ==
Wanaty is a small village located about 6 kilometers from Łaskarzew in central Poland. In February 1944, the village had approximately 25 households, inhabited by 28 families (around 115 people). During the German occupation of Poland, some of the village's inhabitants actively cooperated with the Polish resistance.

On February 21, 1944, a unit of German gendarmerie (rural state police) from Łaskarzew arrived in Wanaty with orders to arrest a villager named Antoni Kędziora. However, about 3 kilometers from Wanaty, in a nearby forest, the Germans were ambushed by Polish partisans. The partisans killed five gendarmes and wounded three others without suffering any casualties (some sources suggest that seven Germans were killed). In retaliation, Nazi-appointed Landrat of Garwolin County, Karl Freudenthal, ordered the pacification of Wanaty.

There may have been additional motives for the massacre. In a report by the underground Government Delegation for Poland, dated April 4, 1944, it was noted that the Wanaty massacre preceded a large roundup organized by the Nazis in the Garwolin County to fulfill a forced labor quota for the German Reich. It was therefore assumed that the destruction of the village was intended to intimidate the local population and facilitate deportations.

Meanwhile, shortly after the skirmish, most of the men from Wanaty fled to neighboring villages to hide. However, the Nazis resorted to deception, exacting their revenge only a week later, when the villagers believed the worst danger had passed. By that time, almost all of the men had returned to Wanaty.

== The massacre ==
The Germans committed significant forces to the operation in Wanaty. The pacification involved gendarmerie and Gestapo officers from posts in Garwolin, Łaskarzew, and Sobolew. The presence of Eastern European collaborators was also noted—some sources refer to them as "Ukrainians," while others describe them as a "Kalmyk detachment." Additionally, there are reports that officers of the German Kriminalpolizei (Criminal Police) and Polish Blue Police also participated in the massacre. In total, up to 800 policemen and SS personnel may have taken part.

On the night of February 27–28, 1944, Wanaty was completely surrounded by a German punitive expedition. Anyone who tried to escape was killed on the spot. Then, at around 7:00 AM, the Germans entered the village. The first group moved from house to house, murdering all residents regardless of age or gender, usually by shooting them in the back of the head. A second group followed, looting livestock and all valuable items from the farms. At the very end, a four-person arson squad set fire to the buildings. Seriously wounded Poles were left inside the burning houses to perish.

At around 10:00 AM, Landrat Karl Freudenthal arrived at the scene of the massacre. To spread fear among the population, he ordered all village heads (sołtyses) from the Łaskarzew commune to be brought to Wanaty to witness the devastation firsthand.

That day, 108 Poles were murdered in Wanaty, including 35 women and 47 children. (Note: Some sources state that 109 people were murdered in Wanaty that day (see: Fajkowski (1972), p. 299 and Madajczyk (1965), pp. 10, 131). Furthermore, depending on the age limit adopted, different numbers of murdered children are given.) Of the victims, 105 were residents of Wanaty, while three others came from neighboring villages (Dąbrowa, Stary Pilczyn, and Podwierzbie). The Germans burned down all the farms and the local mill.

Despite their wounds, two Wanaty residents survived the massacre. Those who were outside the village that day also survived.

== Aftermath ==
Shortly after the massacre, the bodies of the murdered residents of Wanaty were gathered and buried in the parish cemetery in Łaskarzew. After the war, a small monument was placed at the mass grave. It bears the following inscription:

Here lie the ashes of 108 people murdered and burned by the Germans in the village of Wanaty on February 28, 1944. From our toil and pain, Poland will rise to live.

Additionally, an obelisk with a commemorative plaque honoring the victims was erected in Wanaty.

Landrat Karl Freudenthal was killed on July 6, 1944, in an attack organized by Home Army soldiers.

== Bibliography ==
- Bojarska, Barbara (1966). "Pacyfikacja wsi Wanaty w lutym 1944 roku" [Pacification of the village of Wanaty in February 1944]. Przegląd Zachodni (in Polish). 5. Western Institute.
- Fajkowski, Józef (1972). Wieś w ogniu. Eksterminacja wsi polskiej w okresie okupacji hitlerowskiej [A countryside on fire. The extermination of the Polish villages during the Nazi occupation] (in Polish). Warszawa: Ludowa Spółdzielnia Wydawnicza.
- Fajkowski, Józef; Religa, Jan (1981). Zbrodnie hitlerowskie na wsi polskiej 1939–1945 [Nazi crimes in the Polish countryside 1939–1945] (in Polish). Warszawa: Książka i Wiedza.
- Madajczyk, Czesław (1965). Hitlerowski terror na wsi polskiej 1939–1945. Zestawienie większych akcji represyjnych [Nazi terror in the Polish countryside 1939–1945. List of major repressive actions] (in Polish). Warszawa: Państwowe Wydawnictwo Naukowe.
- Markowska, Ewa, ed. (1980). Garwolin. Dzieje miasta i okolicy [Garwolin. History of the city and its surroundings] (in Polish). Warszawa: Książka i Wiedza.
