= Kraski =

Kraski (Belarusian: Краскі, Russian: Краски, lit.: Paints) may refer to:

Places

- Kraski, Łódź Voivodeship, village in Poland
- Kraski, Grodno Region, village in Grodno Region, Belarus
- Kraski, Pastavy Raion, village in Vitebsk Region, Belarus
- Kraski, Vitebsk District, village in Vitebsk Region, Belarus
- Kraski, Arkhangelsk Oblast, village in Russia
- Kraski, Tver Oblast, village in Russia

Other

- Kraski (band), pop/Eurodance musical band from Belarus

== See also ==
- Kraski Dolne - village in Masovian Voivodeship, Poland
- Kraski Górne - village in Masovian Voivodeship, Poland
- Kraski-Ślesice - village in Masovian Voivodeship, Poland
