= Wanaty =

Wanaty may refer to the following places:

- Wanaty, Masovian Voivodeship
  - Wanaty massacre
- Wanaty, Silesian Voivodeship
