= Reduction =

Reduction, reduced, reduce, or similar may refer to:

== Science and technology ==
=== Chemistry ===
- Reduction (chemistry), part of a reduction-oxidation (redox) reaction in which atoms have their oxidation state changed
  - Organic redox reaction, a redox reaction that takes place with organic compounds
  - Ore reduction; see smelting

=== Computing and mathematics ===
- Reducible as the opposite of irreducible (mathematics)
- Reduction (mathematics), the rewriting of an expression into a simpler form
- Reduction (complexity), a transformation of one problem into another problem

==== Data science and array processing ====
- Data reduction, simplifying data in order to facilitate analysis
- Reduce (higher-order function), in functional programming, a family of higher-order functions that process a data structure in some order and build up a return value
- Reduction operator, a type of operator commonly used in parallel programming to reduce the elements of an array into a single result
- Dimension reduction, the process of reducing the number of random variables under consideration
- Reduced form, in statistics, an equation which relates the endogenous variable X to all the available exogenous variables, both those included in the regression of interest (W) and the instruments (Z)
- Reduced row echelon form, a certain reduced row echelon form of a matrix which completely and uniquely determines its row space
- Variance reduction, a procedure used to increase the precision of the estimates that can be obtained for a given number of iterations

==== Model theory, abstract algebra, and geometry ====
- Partial order reduction, a technique for reducing the size of the state-space to be searched by a model checking algorithm
- Lattice reduction, given an integer lattice basis as input, to find a basis with short, nearly orthogonal vectors
- Reduction of the structure group, for a $G$-bundle $B$ and a map $H \to G$ an $H$-bundle $B_H$ such that the pushout $B_H \times_H G$ is isomorphic to $B$
- Reduced homology, a minor modification made to homology theory in algebraic topology, designed to make a point have all its homology groups zero
- Reduced product, a construction that generalizes both direct product and ultraproduct
- Reduced ring, a ring with no non-zero nilpotent elements
- Reduced word, in a free group, a word with no adjacent generator-inverse pairs

==== Other uses in computer science theory ====
- Reduction (recursion theory), given sets A and B of natural numbers, is it possible to effectively convert a method for deciding membership in B into a method for deciding membership in A?
- Graph reduction, an efficient version of non-strict evaluation
- L-reduction, a transformation of optimization problems which keeps the approximability features
- Strength reduction, a compiler optimization where a function of some systematically changing variable is calculated more efficiently by using previous values of the function
- Reduced instruction set computing, a CPU design philosophy favoring an instruction set reduced in size and complexity of addressing, to simplify implementation, instruction level parallelism, and compiling
- Beta reduction, the rewriting of an expression from lambda calculus into a simpler form
- Subject reduction or preservation, a rewrite of an expression that does not change its type
- Reduction system, reduction strategy, the application of rewriting systems to eliminate reducible expressions

==== Other uses in computing and mathematics ====
- Bit Rate Reduction, an audio compression method
- Reduce (computer algebra system), a general-purpose computer algebra system geared towards applications in physics
- Reduction of order, a technique for solving second-order ordinary differential equations
- Reduced residue system, a set of φ(n) integers such that each integer is relatively prime to n and no two are congruent modulo n

=== Medicine ===
==== Medical procedures ====
- Lung volume reduction surgery, a treatment for chronic obstructive pulmonary disease
- Selective reduction (or fetal reduction), the practice of reducing the number of fetuses in a multifetal pregnancy
- Reduction (orthopedic surgery), a medical procedure to restore a fracture or dislocation to the correct alignment
- Ventricular reduction, a type of operation in cardiac surgery
- Cosmetic surgery:
  - Breast reduction
  - Jaw reduction

==== Other uses in medicine ====
- Weight loss
- In epidemiology:
  - Relative risk reduction, the absolute risk reduction by the control event rate
  - Absolute risk reduction, the decrease in risk of a given activity or treatment in relation to a control activity or treatment
- Urea reduction ratio (URR), a dimensionless number used to quantify hemodialysis treatment adequacy

=== Physics ===
- Dimensional reduction, the limit of a compactified theory where the size of the compact dimension goes to zero
- Reduction criterion, in quantum information theory, a necessary condition a mixed state must satisfy in order for it to be separable
- Reduced mass, the "effective" inertial mass appearing in the two-body problem of Newtonian mechanics
- Reduced properties (pressure, temperature, or volume) of a fluid, defined based on the fluid's critical point

=== Other uses in science and technology ===
- Lithic reduction, in Stone Age toolmaking, to detach lithic flakes from a lump of tool stone
- Noise reduction, in acoustic or signal processing
- Reduction drive, a mechanical device to shift rotational speed

== Arts and media ==
- Reducing (film), a 1931 American film
- Reduction (music), music arranged for smaller resources (piano) for easier analysis or performance

== Linguistics ==
- Accent reduction, modifying one's foreign accent towards that of a native speaker
- Vowel reduction, any change in vowel quality perceived as "weakening"
  - Vowel reduction in English
- Definite article reduction, use of vowel-less forms of the English definite article in Northern England

== Philosophy ==
- Reductionism, a range of philosophical systems
- Reductio ad absurdum, a form of argument in which a proposition is disproven by following its implications to an absurd consequence
- Eidetic reduction, a technique in the study of essences in phenomenology whose goal is to identify the basic components of phenomena
- Bracketing (phenomenology), also known as phenomenological reduction or transcendental reduction
- Intertheoretic reduction, in philosophy of science, one theory makes predictions that perfectly or almost perfectly match the predictions of a second theory

== Military and politics ==
- Reduction in rank, in military law
- Reduction (military), the siege and capture of a fortified place
- Reductions, resettlements of indigenous peoples in Spanish-colonized America intended to control and Christianize Indians
  - Indian reductions in the Andes, settlements in the Andes to control and Christianize Indians
- Reduction (Sweden), a return to the Crown of fiefs that had been granted to the Swedish nobility

== Other uses ==
- Reduction (cooking), the process of thickening or intensifying the flavor of a liquid mixture such as a soup, sauce, wine, or juice by evaporation
- Reduce (waste), practices of minimizing waste
- Reduction, Pennsylvania, unincorporated community, US
- Reduction to practice, in US patent law, the embodiment of the concept of an invention
- Ego reduction, predicated on the use of Sigmund Freud's concept of the ego

== See also ==
- Reducin, a village in Poland
- Reduct, a transformation of an algebraic structure in universal algebra and in model theory
- Reducing agent
- Risk reduction (disambiguation)
