= Pasternik, Masovian Voivodeship =

Pasternik
- Village
- Location within Poland
- Coordinates: 51°42′25″N 21°27′36″E
- Country: Poland
- Voivodeship: Masovian
- County: Garwolin
- Gmina: Maciejowice

Pasternik [pasˈtɛrnik] is a village in the administrative district of Gmina Maciejowice, within Garwolin County, Masovian Voivodeship, in east-central Poland.
