= Oronne =

- Village
- Location within Poland
- Coordinates: 51°43′N 21°37′E
- Country: Poland
- Voivodeship: Masovian
- County: Garwolin
- Gmina: Maciejowice

Oronne [ɔˈrɔnnɛ] is a village in the administrative district of Gmina Maciejowice, within Garwolin County, Masovian Voivodeship, in east-central Poland.
