= Rowy, Garwolin County =

Rowy
- Village
- Location within Poland
- Coordinates: 51°49′49″N 21°38′07″E
- Country: Poland
- Voivodeship: Masovian
- County: Garwolin
- Gmina: Łaskarzew

Rowy [ˈrɔvɨ] is a village in the administrative district of Gmina Łaskarzew, within Garwolin County, Masovian Voivodeship, in east-central Poland.
