= Podstolice =

Podstolice may refer to the following places:

- Podstolice, Chodzież County in Greater Poland Voivodeship (west-central Poland)
- Podstolice, Lesser Poland Voivodeship (south Poland)
- Podstolice, Masovian Voivodeship (east-central Poland)
- Podstolice, Września County in Greater Poland Voivodeship (west-central Poland)
