= Goździk, Masovian Voivodeship =

Goździk
- Village
- Location within Poland
- Coordinates: 51°54′29″N 21°52′0″E
- Country: Poland
- Voivodeship: Masovian
- County: Garwolin
- Gmina: Górzno

Goździk [ˈɡɔʑd͡ʑik] is a village in the administrative district of Gmina Górzno, within Garwolin County, Masovian Voivodeship, in east-central Poland.
