= Potaszniki =

- Village
- Location within Poland
- Coordinates: 51°49′N 21°43′E
- Country: Poland
- Voivodeship: Masovian
- County: Garwolin
- Gmina: Górzno

Potaszniki [pɔtaʂˈniki] is a village in the administrative district of Gmina Górzno, within Garwolin County, Masovian Voivodeship, in east-central Poland.
