= Pogorzelec =

Pogorzelec may refer to the following places:

- Pogorzelec, Lublin Voivodeship (east Poland)
- Pogorzelec, Podlaskie Voivodeship (north-east Poland)
- Pogorzelec, Subcarpathian Voivodeship (south-east Poland)
- Pogorzelec, Garwolin County in Masovian Voivodeship (east-central Poland)
- Pogorzelec, Pułtusk County in Masovian Voivodeship (east-central Poland)
- Pogorzelec, Węgrów County in Masovian Voivodeship (east-central Poland)
