= Nowy Żabieniec =

- Village
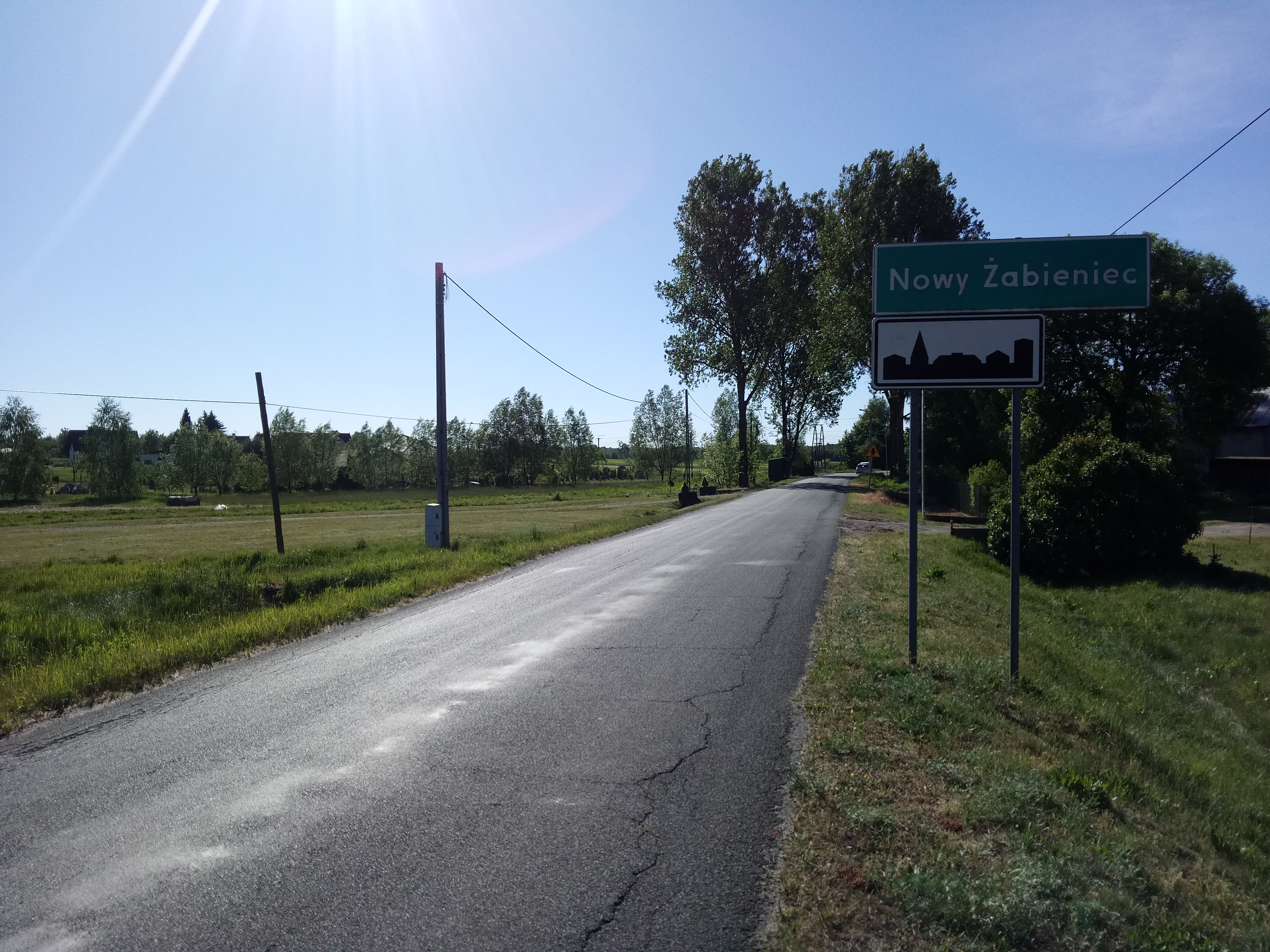

- Location within Poland
- Coordinates: 51°50′46″N 21°28′52″E
- Country: Poland
- Voivodeship: Masovian
- County: Garwolin
- Gmina: Wilga

Nowy Żabieniec [ˈnɔvɨ ʐaˈbjɛɲɛt͡s] is a village in the administrative district of Gmina Wilga, within Garwolin County, Masovian Voivodeship, in east-central Poland.
