= Maciejowice =

- Town
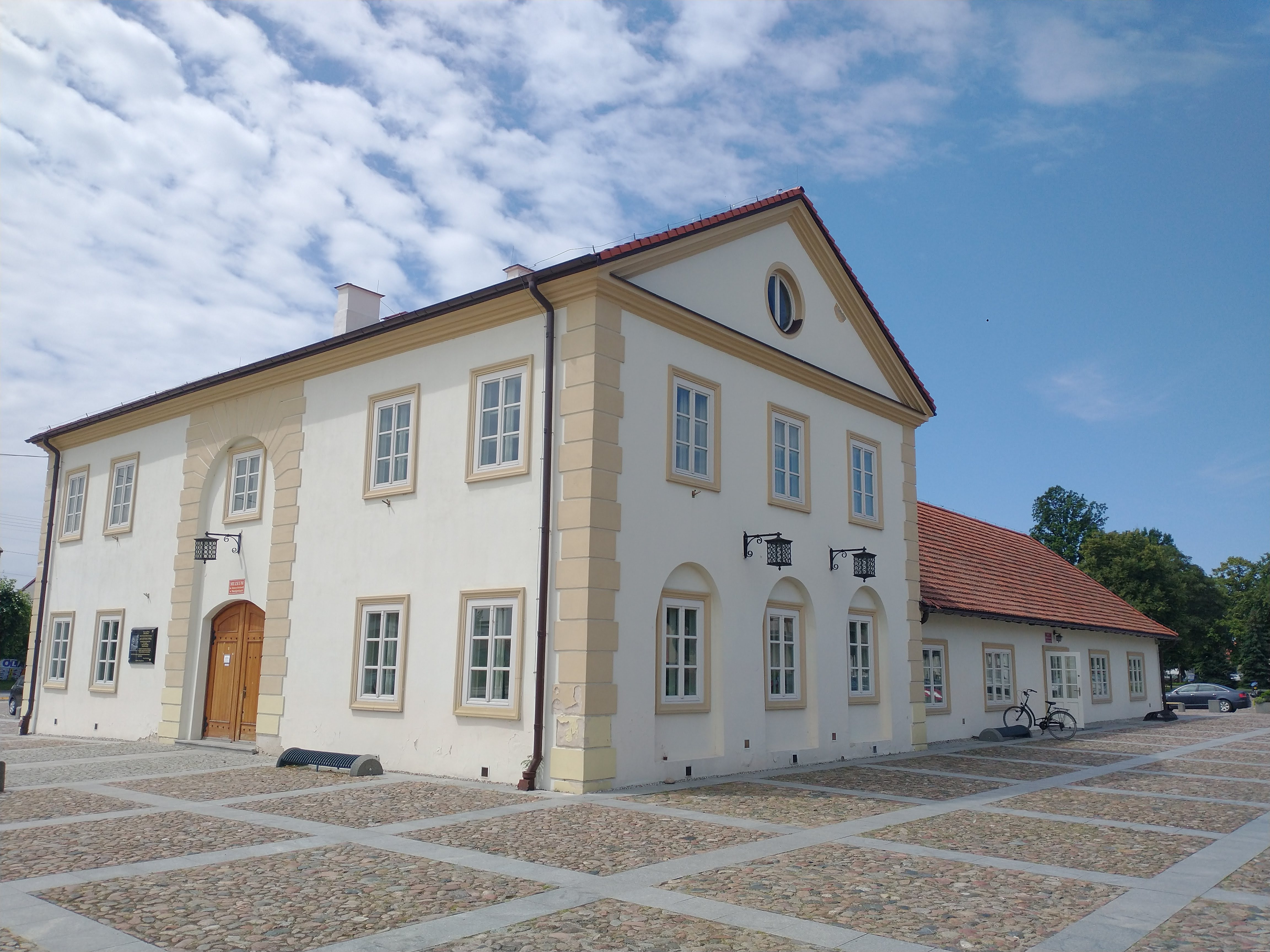
- Town hall

- Coat of arms

- Location within Poland
- Coordinates: 51°41′N 21°33′E
- Country: Poland
- Voivodeship: Masovian
- County: Garwolin
- Gmina: Maciejowice
- Town rights: 1507

Population
  - Total: 1,400
- Time zone: UTC+1 (CET)
  - Summer (DST): UTC+2 (CEST)
- Vehicle registration: WG
- Website: http://www.maciejowice.pl

Maciejowice [mat͡ɕɛjɔˈvit͡sɛ] is a town in Garwolin County, Masovian Voivodeship, in east-central Poland. It is the seat of the gmina (administrative district) called Gmina Maciejowice.

For centuries, Maciejowice was part of the Land of Stężyca, which belonged to Lesser Poland's Sandomierz Voivodeship. In 1794, the Battle of Maciejowice took place near the town.

== Etymology ==
Its name comes from the Maciejowski family, which in the past owned Maciejowice.

== History ==
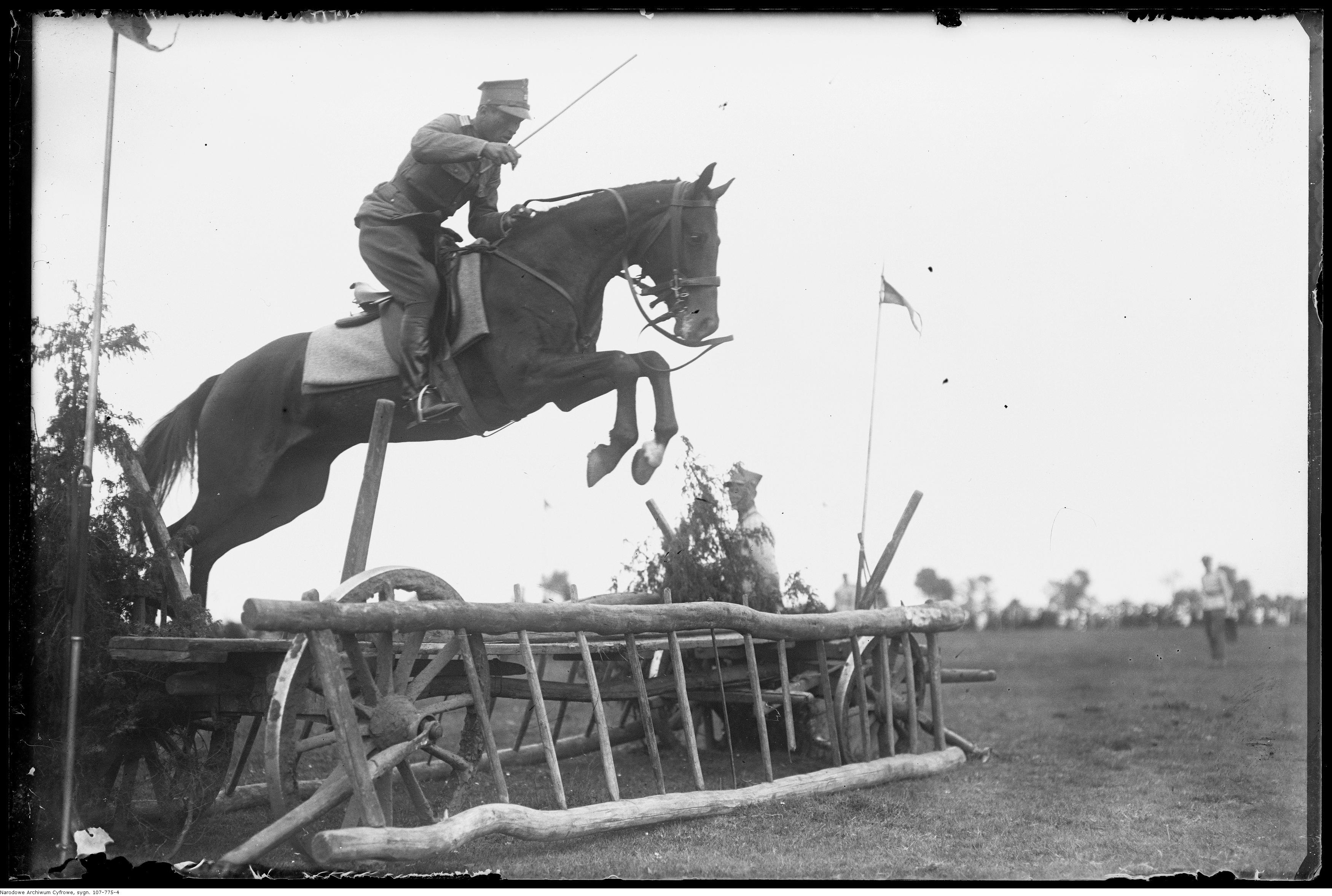
Equestrian competition in Maciejowice in 1936

In the early years of the Polish statehood, this part of the country was sparsely populated. The first local village, mentioned in documents, is Kochów (one kilometer south of Maciejowice), which was founded in 1155. In the late 12th century, a Roman Catholic parish of Kochów was established, and in the 15th century, the area of the future Maciejowice was purchased by a local nobleman Kacper Maciejowski. The town remained in the hands of the Maciejowski family until the late 17th century.

In 1507, King Sigismund I the Old granted town charter to Maciejowice. The town itself was located in the area of the village of Ostrow. In 1557, King Sigismund II Augustus granted several privileges to Maciejowice. The town at that time belonged to the Castellan of Sandomierz, Stanislaw Maciejowski, and with the royal permission, it was allowed to organize fairs. Furthermore, the construction of a defensive castle was initiated. Since the late 17th century Maciejowice belonged to several noble families, such as the Potocki family and the Zamoyski family. Until the Partitions of Poland, it remained in Sandomierz Voivodeship in the Lesser Poland Province. In 1815 - 1915, it was part of Russian-controlled Congress Poland.

In the late 18th and early 19th centuries, the Zamoyski family opened here an Agricultural School, rebuilt the castle, and opened several enterprises. During the January Uprising, a local unit of Polish rebels under Colonel Walenty Lewandowski attacked a Russian unit located at Łaskarzew (Jan. 28, 1863). In 1870, following many other locations of northern Lesser Poland, Maciejowice lost its town charter.

In the summer of 1915, heavy Russian-German fighting took place in the area of the village, and on August 13, 1920 (see Polish-Soviet War), a Red Army unit penetrated as far as a local village of Kobylnica. In September 1939, during the Invasion of Poland, two large units of the Polish Army (13th Infantry Division and Wilenska Cavalry Brigade) evacuated eastwards on a wooden bridge at Przewoz. The bridge was destroyed on Sept. 9, 1939.

== Sights ==
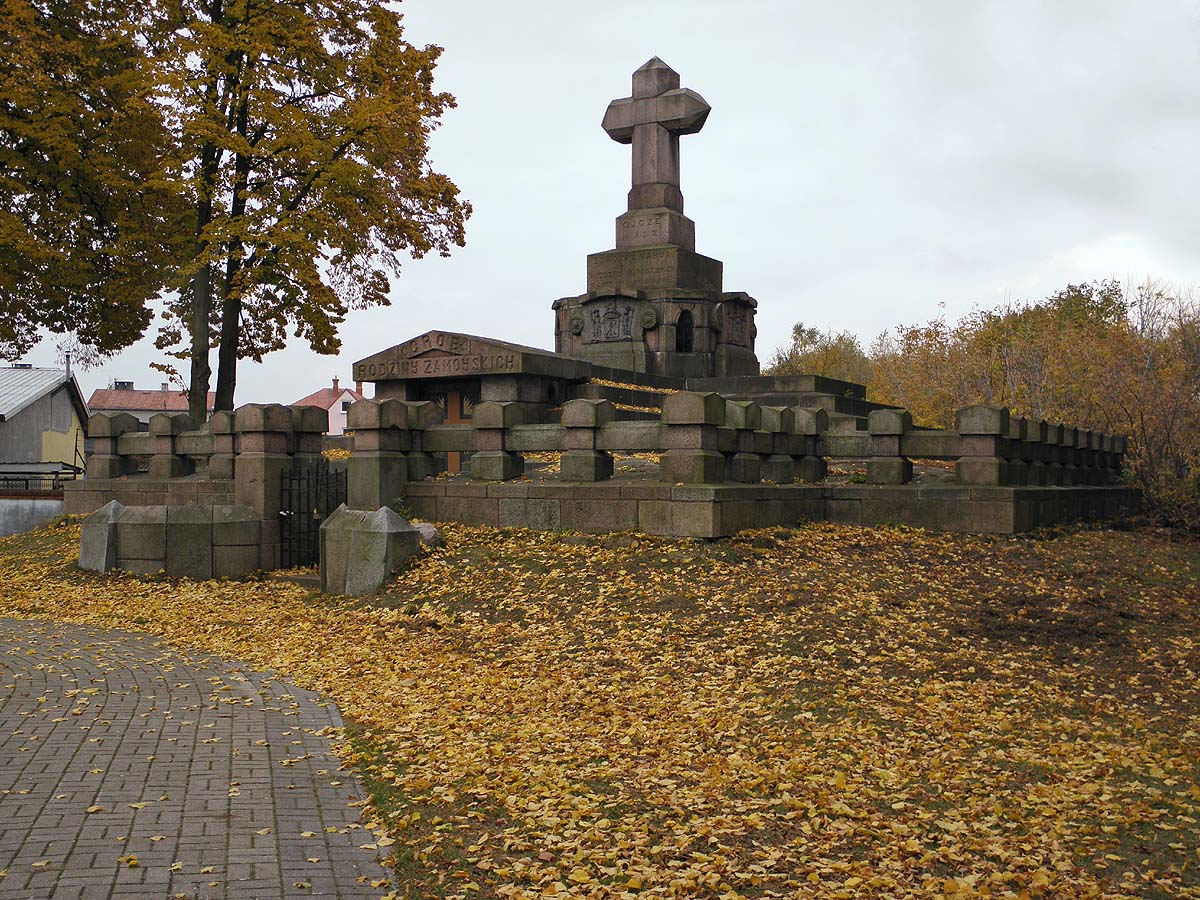
Zamoyski Mausoleum

Among points of interest there are:

- cobbled market place with a town hall, a museum and a former hospital (1796),
- Roman Catholic parish church (1772-1780),
- two monuments of Tadeusz Kosciuszko,
- a tomb of the Zamoyski family, located behind the church (1908),
- a palace at Podzamcze, with stables, located in the spot of the ancient castle.

== Transport ==
Maciejowice lies on the intersection of vovoideship roads 807 and 801.

The nearest railway station is in Sobolew to the east.
