= Lipniki, Garwolin County =

Lipniki
- Village
- Location within Poland
- Coordinates: 51°47′N 21°32′E
- Country: Poland
- Voivodeship: Masovian
- County: Garwolin
- Gmina: Łaskarzew
- Time zone: UTC+1 (CET)
  - Summer (DST): UTC+2 (CEST)

Lipniki (Polish pronunciation: [lipˈɲikʲi]) is a village in the administrative district of Gmina Łaskarzew, within Garwolin County, Masovian Voivodeship, in east-central Poland.

One Polish citizen was murdered by Nazi Germany in the village during World War II.
