= Oblin-Grądki =

- Village
- Location within Poland
- Coordinates: 51°42′30″N 21°30′32″E
- Country: Poland
- Voivodeship: Masovian
- County: Garwolin
- Gmina: Maciejowice

Oblin-Grądki [ˈɔblin ˈɡrɔntki] is a village in the administrative district of Gmina Maciejowice, within Garwolin County, Masovian Voivodeship, in east-central Poland.
