= Izdebno, Masovian Voivodeship =

Izdebno
- Village
- Location within Poland
- Coordinates: 51°50′N 21°34′E
- Country: Poland
- Voivodeship: Masovian
- County: Garwolin
- Gmina: Łaskarzew

Izdebno [izˈdɛbnɔ] is a village in the administrative district of Gmina Łaskarzew, within Garwolin County, Masovian Voivodeship, in east-central Poland.
