= Kobylnica-Kolonia =

- Village
- Location within Poland
- Coordinates: 51°38′29″N 21°34′47″E
- Country: Poland
- Voivodeship: Masovian
- County: Garwolin
- Gmina: Maciejowice

Kobylnica-Kolonia [kɔbɨlˈnit͡sa kɔˈlɔɲa] is a village in the administrative district of Gmina Maciejowice, within Garwolin County, Masovian Voivodeship, in east-central Poland.
