= Tarnów, Masovian Voivodeship =

Tarnów
- Village
- Location within Poland
- Coordinates: 51°48′N 21°27′E
- Country: Poland
- Voivodeship: Masovian
- County: Garwolin
- Gmina: Wilga
- Population: 90
- Postal code: 08-470
- Area code: 25
- Vehicle registration: WG

Tarnów [ˈtarnuf] is a village in the administrative district of Gmina Wilga, within Garwolin County, Masovian Voivodeship, in east-central Poland.

== The Aleksa Votive Chapel ==
The small and modest building built near the village of Tarnów was designed by Marta and Lech Rowiński, as a wooden structure in a form of chapel with small bell tower. Three windowless walls are fully covered by wooden elements and the fourth wall is made entirely of glass. The structure is usually called a chapel or church, but it is incorrect, as stated in a letter by local Catholic bishop of diocese of Siedlce in 2020, as it has never been consecrated.

This timber chapel-like building received a measure of international acclaim by being shortlisted for 2011 EU Prize for Contemporary Architecture - the Mies van der Rohe Award. Locally, it was honored by getting into top 5 candidates list for annual architecture award of Polityka magazine in 2011.
