= Goźlin Górny =

- Village
- Location within Poland
- Coordinates: 51°53′30″N 21°19′22″E
- Country: Poland
- Voivodeship: Masovian
- County: Garwolin
- Gmina: Wilga
- Time zone: UTC+1 (CET)
  - Summer (DST): UTC+2 (CEST)

Goźlin Górny [ˈɡɔʑlin ˈɡurnɨ] is a village in the administrative district of Gmina Wilga, within Garwolin County, Masovian Voivodeship, in east-central Poland.

Six Polish citizens were murdered by Nazi Germany in the village during World War II.
