= Polik, Garwolin County =

Polik
- Village
- Location within Poland
- Coordinates: 51°43′11″N 21°35′38″E
- Country: Poland
- Voivodeship: Masovian
- County: Garwolin
- Gmina: Maciejowice

Polik [ˈpɔlik] is a village in the administrative district of Gmina Maciejowice, within Garwolin County, Masovian Voivodeship, in east-central Poland.
