= Nowy Helenów =

- Settlement
- Location within Poland
- Coordinates: 51°45′48″N 21°37′05″E
- Country: Poland
- Voivodeship: Masovian
- County: Garwolin
- Gmina: Łaskarzew

Nowy Helenów [ˈnɔvɨ xɛˈlɛnuf] is a settlement in the administrative district of Gmina Łaskarzew, within Garwolin County, Masovian Voivodeship, in east-central Poland.
