= Chęciny, Masovian Voivodeship =

Chęciny
- Village
- Location within Poland
- Coordinates: 51°52′6″N 21°44′44″E
- Country: Poland
- Voivodeship: Masovian
- County: Garwolin
- Gmina: Górzno

Chęciny [xɛnˈt͡ɕinɨ] is a village in the administrative district of Gmina Górzno, within Garwolin County, Masovian Voivodeship, in east-central Poland.
