= Mierzączka =

- Village
- Location within Poland
- Coordinates: 51°51′25″N 21°40′33″E
- Country: Poland
- Voivodeship: Masovian
- County: Garwolin
- Gmina: Górzno

Mierzączka [mjɛˈʐɔnt͡ʂka] is a village in the administrative district of Gmina Górzno, within Garwolin County, Masovian Voivodeship, in east-central Poland.
