= Holendry, Masovian Voivodeship =

Holendry
- Village
- Location within Poland
- Coordinates: 51°50′3″N 21°21′45″E
- Country: Poland
- Voivodeship: Masovian
- County: Garwolin
- Gmina: Wilga

Holendry [xɔˈlɛndrɨ] is a village in the administrative district of Gmina Wilga, within Garwolin County, Masovian Voivodeship, in east-central Poland.
