= Dąbrowa-Kolonia, Masovian Voivodeship =

Dąbrowa-Kolonia
- Village
- Location within Poland
- Coordinates: 51°48′31″N 21°31′39″E
- Country: Poland
- Voivodeship: Masovian
- County: Garwolin
- Gmina: Łaskarzew

Dąbrowa-Kolonia [dɔmˈbrɔva kɔˈlɔɲa] is a village in the administrative district of Gmina Łaskarzew, within Garwolin County, Masovian Voivodeship, in east-central Poland.
