= Kobyla Wola =

- Village
- Location within Poland
- Coordinates: 51°50′26″N 21°39′3″E
- Country: Poland
- Voivodeship: Masovian
- County: Garwolin
- Gmina: Górzno
- Population: 315

Kobyla Wola [kɔˈbɨla ˈvɔla] is a village in the administrative district of Gmina Górzno, within Garwolin County, Masovian Voivodeship, in east-central Poland.
