= Trzcianka, Gmina Wilga =

Trzcianka
- Village
- Location within Poland
- Coordinates: 51°51′38″N 21°28′20″E
- Country: Poland
- Voivodeship: Masovian
- County: Garwolin
- Gmina: Wilga

Trzcianka [ˈtʂt͡ɕaŋka] is a village in the administrative district of Gmina Wilga, within Garwolin County, Masovian Voivodeship, in east-central Poland.
