= Stary Helenów =

- Village
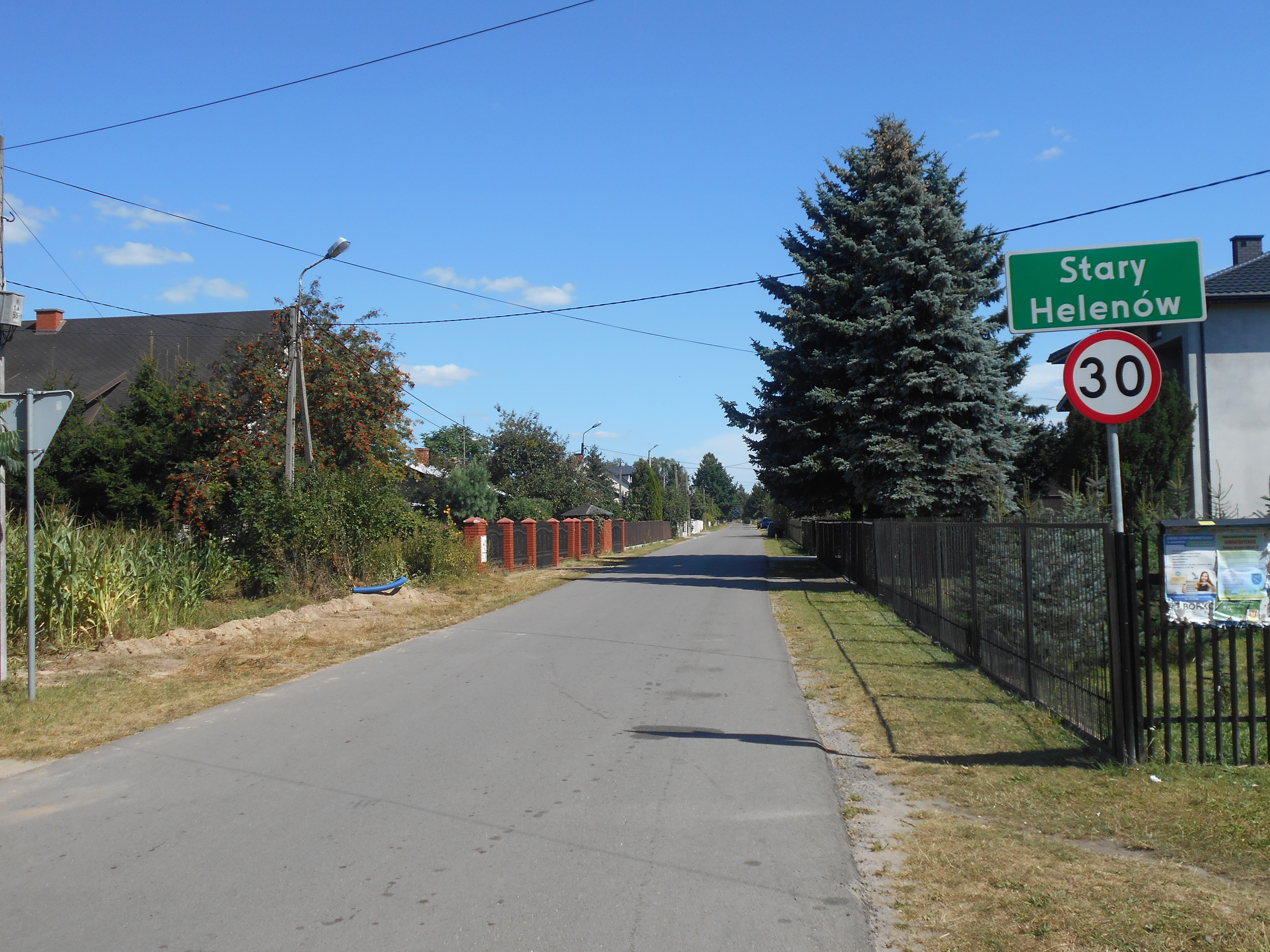

- Location within Poland
- Coordinates: 51°45′38″N 21°36′13″E
- Country: Poland
- Voivodeship: Masovian
- County: Garwolin
- Gmina: Łaskarzew

Stary Helenów [ˈstarɨ xɛˈlɛnuf] is a village in the administrative district of Gmina Łaskarzew, within Garwolin County, Masovian Voivodeship, in east-central Poland.
