= Samogoszcz, Masovian Voivodeship =

Samogoszcz
- Village
- Location within Poland
- Coordinates: 51°46′N 21°29′E
- Country: Poland
- Voivodeship: Masovian
- County: Garwolin
- Gmina: Maciejowice

Samogoszcz [saˈmɔɡɔʂt͡ʂ] is a village in the administrative district of Gmina Maciejowice, within Garwolin County, Masovian Voivodeship, in east-central Poland.
