= Przewóz =

Przewóz may refer to:

- Przewóz, Kuyavian-Pomeranian Voivodeship (north-central Poland)
- Przewóz, Żary County, a village in Lubusz Voivodeship (west Poland)
- Przewóz, Zielona Góra County in Lubusz Voivodeship (west Poland)
- Przewóz, Garwolin County in Masovian Voivodeship (east-central Poland)
- Przewóz, Kozienice County in Masovian Voivodeship (east-central Poland)
- Przewóz, Gmina Małkinia Górna, Ostrów County in Masovian Voivodeship (east-central Poland)
- Przewóz, Opole Voivodeship (south-west Poland)
- Przewóz, Kartuzy County in Pomeranian Voivodeship (north Poland)
- Przewóz, part of the Podgórze district of Kraków
