= Mariańskie Porzecze =

- Village
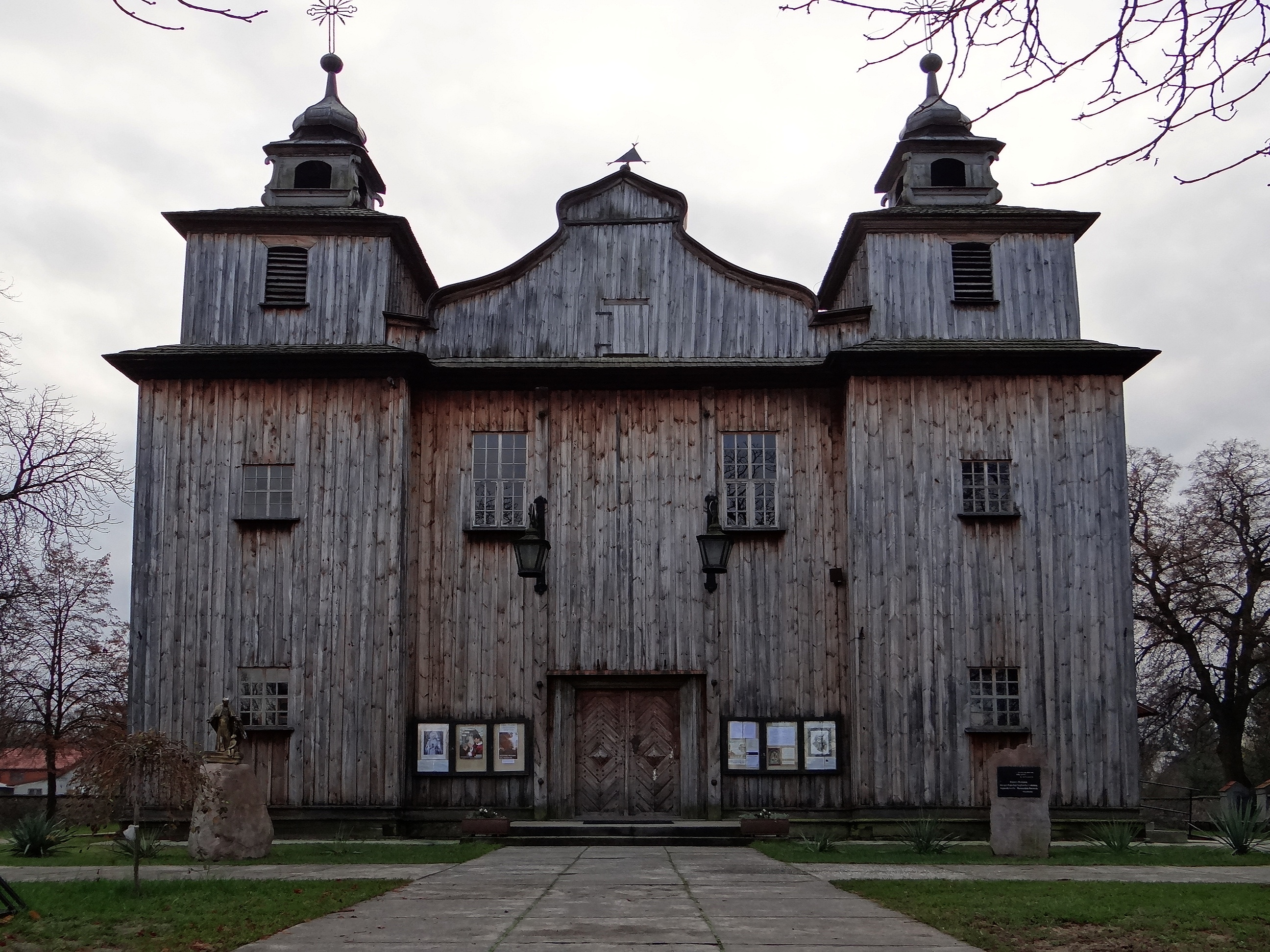
- Mariańskie Porzecze church

- Location within Poland
- Coordinates: 51°52′58″N 21°20′02″E
- Country: Poland
- Voivodeship: Masovian
- County: Garwolin
- Gmina: Wilga

Mariańskie Porzecze [maˈrjaɲskʲɛ pɔˈʐɛt͡ʂɛ] is a village in the administrative district of Gmina Wilga, within Garwolin County, Masovian Voivodeship, in east-central Poland.
