= Ostrów, Garwolin County =

Ostrów
- Village
- Location within Poland
- Coordinates: 51°45′25″N 21°26′34″E
- Country: Poland
- Voivodeship: Masovian
- County: Garwolin
- Gmina: Maciejowice
- Population: 100

Ostrów [ˈɔstruf] is a village in the administrative district of Gmina Maciejowice, within Garwolin County, Masovian Voivodeship, in east-central Poland.
