= Kawęczyn, Garwolin County =

Kawęczyn
- Village
- Location within Poland
- Coordinates: 51°41′N 21°36′E
- Country: Poland
- Voivodeship: Masovian
- County: Garwolin
- Gmina: Maciejowice

Kawęczyn [kaˈvɛnt͡ʂɨn] is a village in the administrative district of Gmina Maciejowice, within Garwolin County, Masovian Voivodeship, in east-central Poland.
