= Stare Podole =

- Village
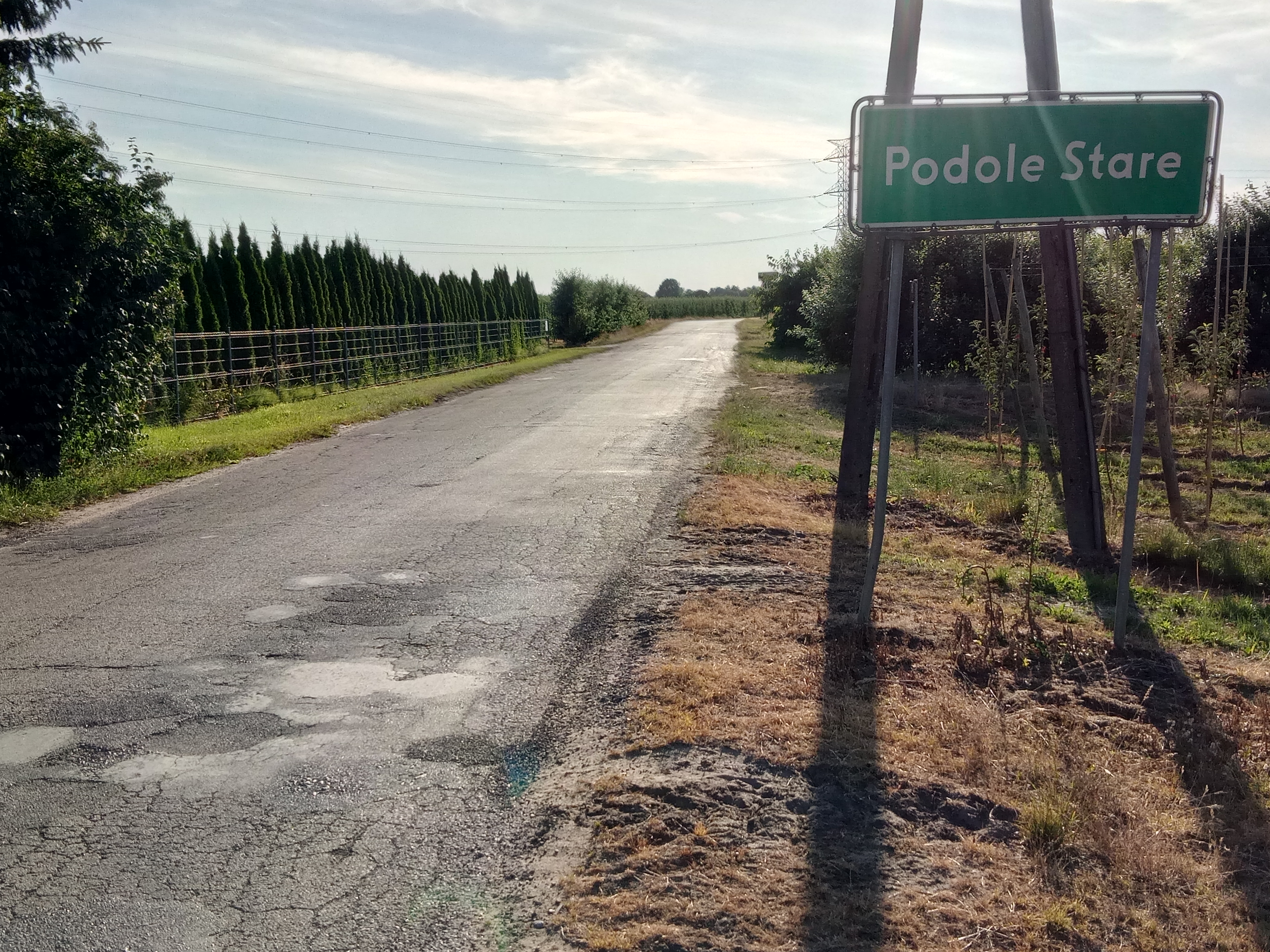

- Location within Poland
- Coordinates: 51°51′22″N 21°18′27″E
- Country: Poland
- Voivodeship: Masovian
- County: Garwolin
- Gmina: Wilga

Stare Podole [ˈstarɛ pɔˈdɔlɛ] is a village in the administrative district of Gmina Wilga, within Garwolin County, Masovian Voivodeship, in east-central Poland.
