= Malinówka, Masovian Voivodeship =

Malinówka
- Village
- Location within Poland
- Coordinates: 51°52′54″N 21°23′30″E
- Country: Poland
- Voivodeship: Masovian
- County: Garwolin
- Gmina: Wilga
- Population: 110

Malinówka [maliˈnufka] is a village in the administrative district of Gmina Wilga, within Garwolin County, Masovian Voivodeship, in east-central Poland.
