= Nieciecz, Masovian Voivodeship =

Nieciecz
- Village
- Location within Poland
- Coordinates: 51°53′N 21°20′E
- Country: Poland
- Voivodeship: Masovian
- County: Garwolin
- Gmina: Wilga

Nieciecz (Polish pronunciation: [ˈɲɛtɕɛtʂ]) is a village in the administrative district of Gmina Wilga, within Garwolin County, Masovian Voivodeship, in east-central Poland.
