= Skurcza =

- Village
- Location within Poland
- Coordinates: 51°49′N 21°25′E
- Country: Poland
- Voivodeship: Masovian
- County: Garwolin
- Gmina: Wilga

Skurcza [ˈskurt͡ʂa] is a village in the administrative district of Gmina Wilga, within Garwolin County, Masovian Voivodeship, in east-central Poland.
