= Uścieniec-Kolonia =

- Village
- Location within Poland
- Coordinates: 51°49′20″N 21°28′38″E
- Country: Poland
- Voivodeship: Masovian
- County: Garwolin
- Gmina: Wilga

Uścieniec-Kolonia [uɕˈt͡ɕɛɲɛt͡s kɔˈlɔɲa] is a village in the administrative district of Gmina Wilga, within Garwolin County, Masovian Voivodeship, in east-central Poland.
