= Józefów, Gmina Górzno =

Józefów
- Village
- Location within Poland
- Coordinates: 51°50′16″N 21°40′13″E
- Country: Poland
- Voivodeship: Masovian
- County: Garwolin
- Gmina: Górzno

Józefów (Polish pronunciation: [juˈzɛfuf]) is a village in the administrative district of Gmina Górzno, within Garwolin County, Masovian Voivodeship, in east-central Poland.
