= Unin, Masovian Voivodeship =

Unin
- Village
- Location within Poland
- Coordinates: 51°54′30″N 21°41′50″E
- Country: Poland
- Voivodeship: Masovian
- County: Garwolin
- Gmina: Górzno

Unin [ˈunin] is a village in the administrative district of Gmina Górzno, within Garwolin County, Masovian Voivodeship, in east-central Poland.
