= Nowy Pilczyn =

- Village
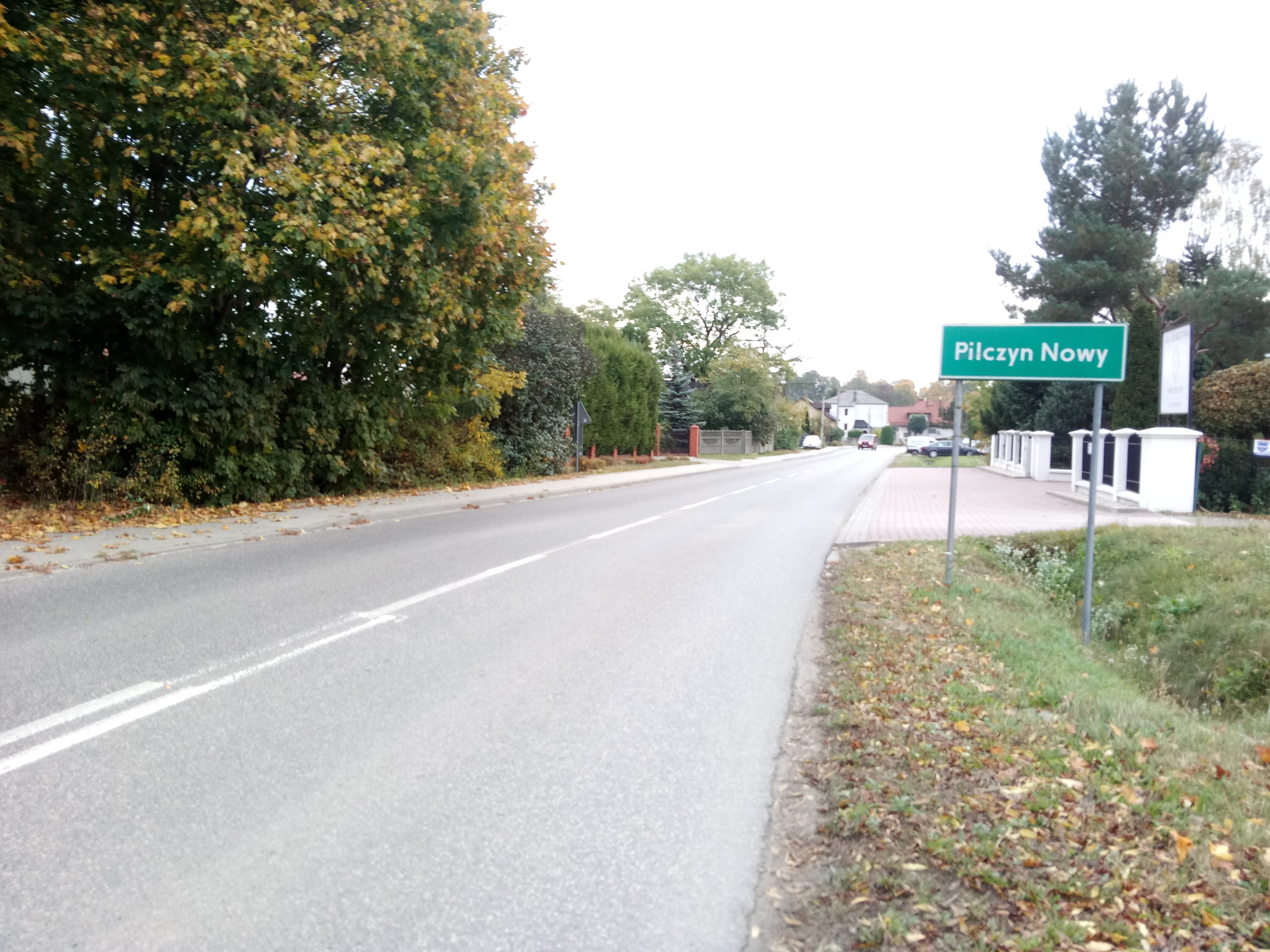

- Location within Poland
- Coordinates: 51°47′N 21°37′E
- Country: Poland
- Voivodeship: Masovian
- County: Garwolin
- Gmina: Łaskarzew
- Population: 270

Nowy Pilczyn [ˈnɔvɨ ˈpilt͡ʂɨn] is a village in the administrative district of Gmina Łaskarzew, within Garwolin County, Masovian Voivodeship, in east-central Poland.
