= Ksawerynów, Masovian Voivodeship =

Ksawerynów
- Village
- Location within Poland
- Coordinates: 51°45′04″N 21°34′14″E
- Country: Poland
- Voivodeship: Masovian
- County: Garwolin
- Gmina: Łaskarzew

Ksawerynów [ksavɛˈrɨnuf] is a village in the administrative district of Gmina Łaskarzew, within Garwolin County, Masovian Voivodeship, in east-central Poland.
