= Izdebno-Kolonia, Masovian Voivodeship =

Izdebno-Kolonia
- Village
- Location within Poland
- Coordinates: 51°48′53″N 21°33′47″E
- Country: Poland
- Voivodeship: Masovian
- County: Garwolin
- Gmina: Łaskarzew

Izdebno-Kolonia [izˈdɛbnɔ kɔˈlɔɲa] is a village in the administrative district of Gmina Łaskarzew, within Garwolin County, Masovian Voivodeship, in east-central Poland.
