= Nowe Podole =

- Village
- Location within Poland
- Coordinates: 51°51′N 21°18′E
- Country: Poland
- Voivodeship: Masovian
- County: Garwolin
- Gmina: Wilga

Nowe Podole [ˈnɔvɛ pɔˈdɔlɛ] is a village in the administrative district of Gmina Wilga, within Garwolin County, Masovian Voivodeship, in east-central Poland.
