= Celejów, Masovian Voivodeship =

Celejów
- Village
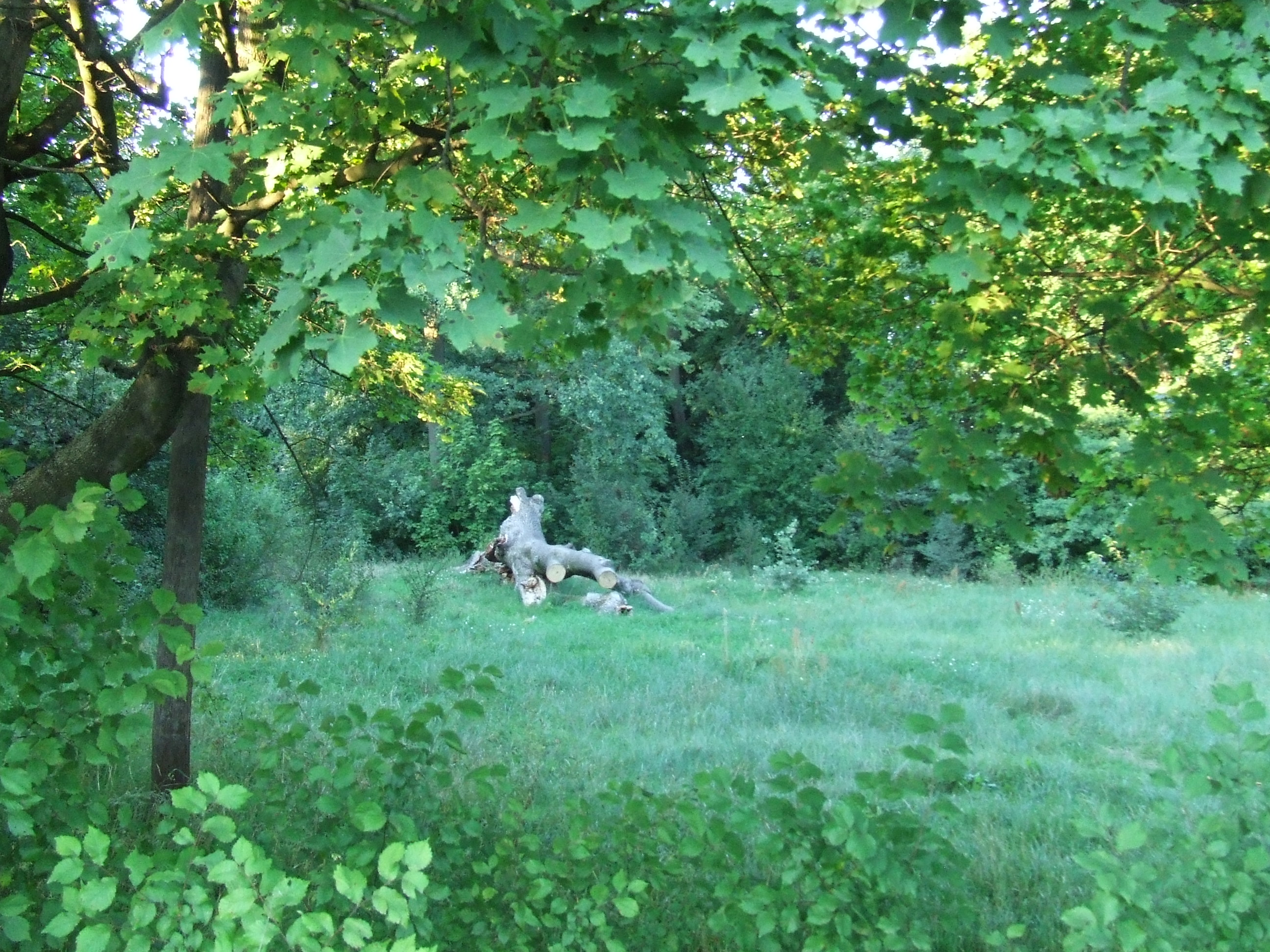
- The remains of the 18th / 19th century manor park in Celejów

- Location within Poland
- Coordinates: 51°51′38″N 21°21′29″E
- Country: Poland
- Voivodeship: Masovian
- County: Garwolin
- Gmina: Wilga

Celejów [t͡sɛˈlɛjuf] is a village in the administrative district of Gmina Wilga, within Garwolin County, Masovian Voivodeship, in east-central Poland.
