= Oblin =

Village in east-central Poland

- Village
- Location within Poland
- Coordinates: 51°42′N 21°32′E
- Country: Poland
- Voivodeship: Masovian
- County: Garwolin
- Gmina: Maciejowice
- Population: 450

Oblin [ˈɔblin] is a village in the administrative district of Gmina Maciejowice, within Garwolin County, Masovian Voivodeship, in east-central Poland.
