= Strych, Masovian Voivodeship =

Strych
- Village
- Location within Poland
- Coordinates: 51°39′30″N 21°36′54″E
- Country: Poland
- Voivodeship: Masovian
- County: Garwolin
- Gmina: Maciejowice

Strych [strɨx] is a village in the administrative district of Gmina Maciejowice, within Garwolin County, Masovian Voivodeship, in east-central Poland.
