= Melanów, Garwolin County =

Melanów
- Village
- Location within Poland
- Coordinates: 51°48′N 21°39′E
- Country: Poland
- Voivodeship: Masovian
- County: Garwolin
- Gmina: Łaskarzew

Melanów [mɛˈlanuf] is a village in the administrative district of Gmina Łaskarzew, within Garwolin County, Masovian Voivodeship, in east-central Poland.

== Population ==
According to the Polish National Census (Narodowy Spis Powszechny) of 2021, the population of Melanów is approximately 375 inhabitants.
