= Górzno-Kolonia =

- Village
- Location within Poland
- Coordinates: 51°50′N 21°42′E
- Country: Poland
- Voivodeship: Masovian
- County: Garwolin
- Gmina: Górzno

Górzno-Kolonia [ˈɡuʐnɔ kɔˈlɔɲa] is a village in the administrative district of Gmina Górzno, within Garwolin County, Masovian Voivodeship, in east-central Poland.
