= Wicie, Masovian Voivodeship =

Wicie
- Village
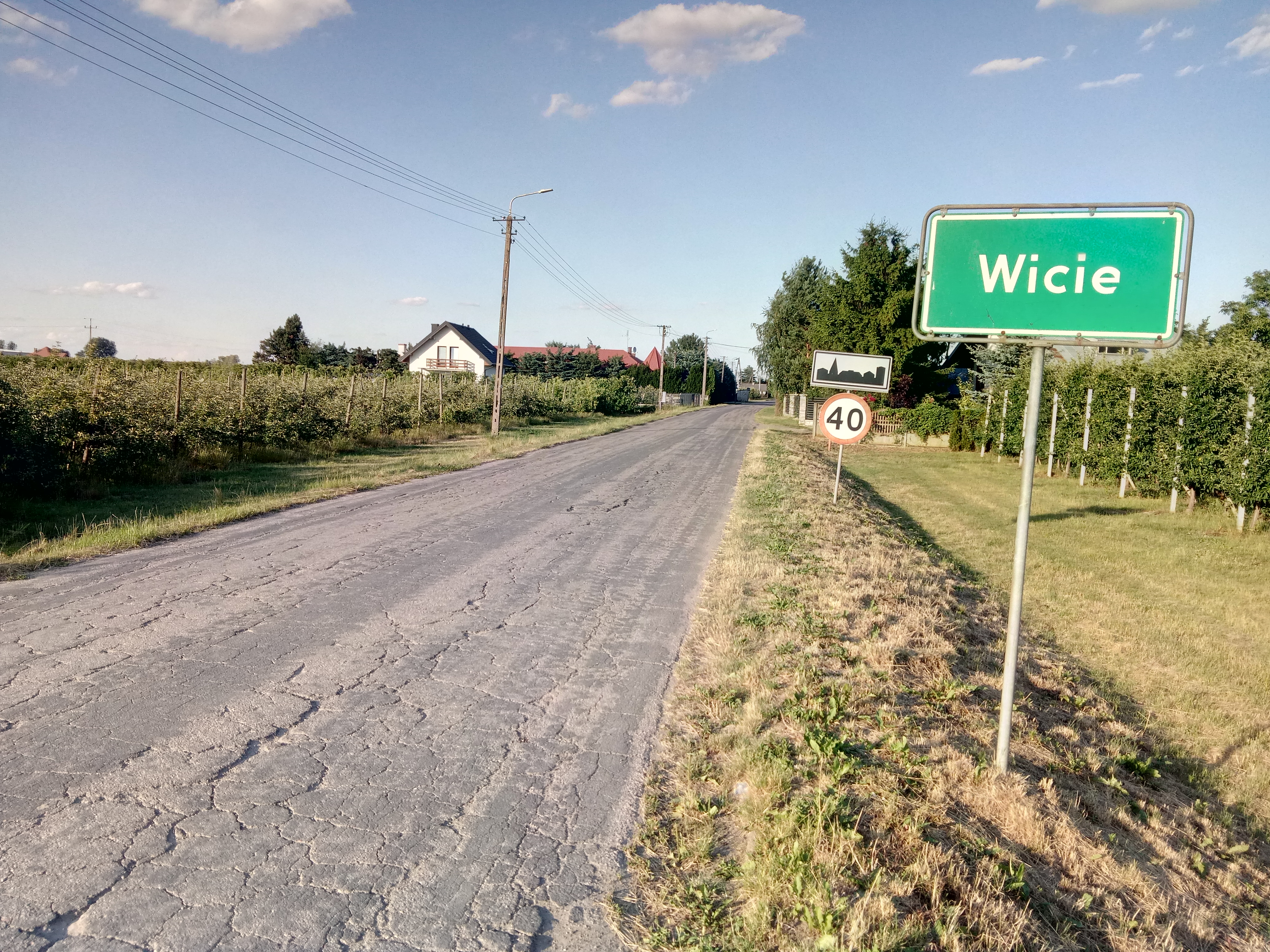

- Location within Poland
- Coordinates: 51°51′55″N 21°19′52″E
- Country: Poland
- Voivodeship: Masovian
- County: Garwolin
- Gmina: Wilga

Wicie [ˈvit͡ɕɛ] is a village in the administrative district of Gmina Wilga, within Garwolin County, Masovian Voivodeship, in east-central Poland.
