= Stary Żabieniec, Masovian Voivodeship =

Stary Żabieniec
- Village
- Location within Poland
- Coordinates: 51°49′58″N 21°29′12″E
- Country: Poland
- Voivodeship: Masovian
- County: Garwolin
- Gmina: Wilga

Stary Żabieniec [ˈstarɨ ʐaˈbjɛɲɛt͡s] is a village in the administrative district of Gmina Wilga, within Garwolin County, Masovian Voivodeship, in east-central Poland.
