= Goźlin Mały =

- Village
- Location within Poland
- Coordinates: 51°53′35″N 21°18′34″E
- Country: Poland
- Voivodeship: Masovian
- County: Garwolin
- Gmina: Wilga

Goźlin Mały [ˈɡɔʑlin ˈmawɨ] is a village in the administrative district of Gmina Wilga, within Garwolin County, Masovian Voivodeship, in east-central Poland.
