= Ostrybór =

- Village
- Location within Poland
- Coordinates: 51°53′17″N 21°21′31″E
- Country: Poland
- Voivodeship: Masovian
- County: Garwolin
- Gmina: Wilga

Ostrybór [ɔsˈtrɨbur] is a village in the administrative district of Gmina Wilga, within Garwolin County, Masovian Voivodeship, in east-central Poland.

In 1975-1998 the town administratively belonged to the province of Siedlce.
