= Cyganówka, Garwolin County =

Cyganówka
- Village
- Location within Poland
- Coordinates: 51°51′N 21°26′E
- Country: Poland
- Voivodeship: Masovian
- County: Garwolin
- Gmina: Wilga

Cyganówka [t͡sɨɡaˈnufka] is a village in the administrative district of Gmina Wilga, within Garwolin County, Masovian Voivodeship, in eastern-central part of Poland.
