= Leonów =

Leonów may refer to the following places:

- Leonów, Piotrków County in Łódź Voivodeship (central Poland)
- Leonów, Lublin Voivodeship (east Poland)
- Leonów, Lublin County in Lublin Voivodeship (east Poland)
- Leonów, Zgierz County in Łódź Voivodeship (central Poland)
- Leonów, Garwolin County in Masovian Voivodeship (east-central Poland)
- Leonów, Mińsk County in Masovian Voivodeship (east-central Poland)
- Leonów, Płock County in Masovian Voivodeship (east-central Poland)
- Leonów, Sochaczew County in Masovian Voivodeship (east-central Poland)
- Leonów, Greater Poland Voivodeship (west-central Poland)
