= Wólka Gruszczyńska =

- Village
- Location within Poland
- Coordinates: 51°50′28″N 21°20′45″E
- Country: Poland
- Voivodeship: Masovian
- County: Garwolin
- Gmina: Wilga
- Population: 147

Wólka Gruszczyńska [ˈvulka ɡruʂˈt͡ʂɨɲska] is a village in the administrative district of Gmina Wilga, within Garwolin County, Masovian Voivodeship, in east-central Poland.
