= Polesie Rowskie =

- Settlement
- Location within Poland
- Coordinates: 51°50′N 21°36′E
- Country: Poland
- Voivodeship: Masovian
- County: Garwolin
- Gmina: Łaskarzew

Polesie Rowskie [pɔˈlɛɕɛ ˈrɔfskʲɛ] is a settlement in the administrative district of Gmina Łaskarzew, within Garwolin County, Masovian Voivodeship, in east-central Poland.
