= Oblin-Korczunek =

- Village
- Location within Poland
- Coordinates: 51°42′39″N 21°28′41″E
- Country: Poland
- Voivodeship: Masovian
- County: Garwolin
- Gmina: Maciejowice

Oblin-Korczunek [ˈɔblin kɔrˈt͡ʂunɛk] is a village in the administrative district of Gmina Maciejowice, within Garwolin County, Masovian Voivodeship, in east-central Poland.
