= Podzamcze, Masovian Voivodeship =

Podzamcze
- Village
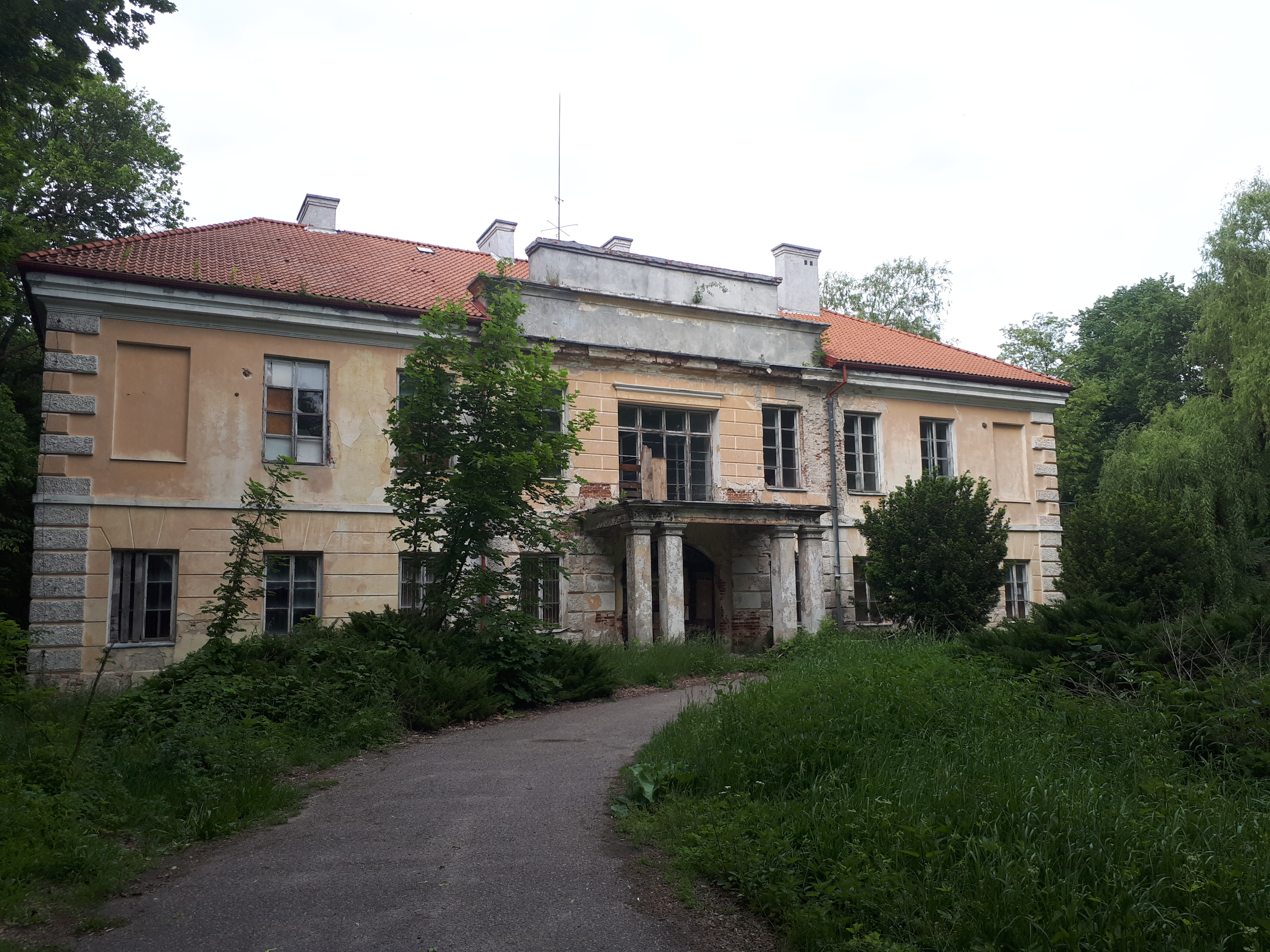
- Zamoyski Palace (2019)

- Location within Poland
- Coordinates: 51°42′2″N 21°35′21″E
- Country: Poland
- Voivodeship: Masovian
- County: Garwolin
- Gmina: Maciejowice

Podzamcze [pɔˈd͡zamt͡ʂɛ] is a village in the administrative district of Gmina Maciejowice, within Garwolin County, Masovian Voivodeship, in east-central Poland.

The village had a State Agricultural Farm. In 1994, it was transformed into Animal Breeding Farm Podzamcze Ltd.
