= Celinów =

Celinów may refer to the following places:

- Celinów, Rawa County in Łódź Voivodeship (central Poland)
- Celinów, Garwolin County in Masovian Voivodeship (east-central Poland)
- Celinów, Kozienice County in Masovian Voivodeship (east-central Poland)
- Celinów, Mińsk County in Masovian Voivodeship (east-central Poland)
