= Zakrzew, Garwolin County =

Zakrzew
- Village
- Location within Poland
- Coordinates: 51°51′21″N 21°20′36″E
- Country: Poland
- Voivodeship: Masovian
- County: Garwolin
- Gmina: Wilga
- Population (approx.): 250

Zakrzew [ˈzakʂɛf] is a village in the administrative district of Gmina Wilga, within Garwolin County, Masovian Voivodeship, in east-central Poland.
