= Kobylnica =

Kobylnica may refer to the following places:

- Kobylnica, Greater Poland Voivodeship (west-central Poland)
- Kobylnica, Masovian Voivodeship (east-central Poland)
- Kobylnica, Pomeranian Voivodeship (north Poland)
