= Gąsów =

- Village
- Location within Poland
- Coordinates: 51°48′23″N 21°42′6″E
- Country: Poland
- Voivodeship: Masovian
- County: Garwolin
- Gmina: Górzno

Gąsów [ˈɡɔ̃suf] is a village in the administrative district of Gmina Górzno, within Garwolin County, Masovian Voivodeship, in east-central Poland. The population in 2021 is 143 people.
