= Samorządki =

- Village
- Location within Poland
- Coordinates: 51°50′N 21°46′E
- Country: Poland
- Voivodeship: Masovian
- County: Garwolin
- Gmina: Górzno

Samorządki [samɔˈʐɔntki] is a village in the administrative district of Gmina Górzno, within Garwolin County, Masovian Voivodeship, in east-central Poland. From 1975 to 1998, it was part of the Siedlce Voivodeship.
