= Piaski, Garwolin County =

Piaski
- Village
- Location within Poland
- Coordinates: 51°50′47″N 21°43′47″E
- Country: Poland
- Voivodeship: Masovian
- County: Garwolin
- Gmina: Górzno

Piaski (Polish pronunciation: [ˈpjaskʲi]) is a village in the administrative district of Gmina Górzno, within Garwolin County, Masovian Voivodeship, in east-central Poland.
