= Baczki =

Baczki may refer to the following places in Masovian Voivodeship, Poland:

- Baczki, Sokołów County
- Baczki, Węgrów County
- Bączki, Garwolin County
