= Budy Podłęskie =

- Village
- Location within Poland
- Coordinates: 51°43′48″N 21°28′17″E
- Country: Poland
- Voivodeship: Masovian
- County: Garwolin
- Gmina: Maciejowice

Budy Podłęskie [ˈbudɨ pɔdˈwɛ̃skʲɛ] is a village in the administrative district of Gmina Maciejowice, within Garwolin County, Masovian Voivodeship, in east-central Poland.
