= Wróble-Wargocin =

- Village
- Location within Poland
- Coordinates: 51°37′40″N 21°35′40″E
- Country: Poland
- Voivodeship: Masovian
- County: Garwolin
- Gmina: Maciejowice
- Population: 240

Wróble-Wargocin [ˈvrublɛ varˈɡɔt͡ɕin] is a village in the administrative district of Gmina Maciejowice, within Garwolin County, Masovian Voivodeship, in east-central Poland.
