= Ruda Tarnowska =

- Village
- Location within Poland
- Coordinates: 51°48′N 21°28′E
- Country: Poland
- Voivodeship: Masovian
- County: Garwolin
- Gmina: Wilga
- Population: 215

Ruda Tarnowska [ˈruda tarˈnɔfska] is a village in the administrative district of Gmina Wilga, within Garwolin County, Masovian Voivodeship, in east-central Poland.
