= Uścieniec =

- Village
- Location within Poland
- Coordinates: 51°48′50″N 21°30′17″E
- Country: Poland
- Voivodeship: Masovian
- County: Garwolin
- Gmina: Łaskarzew

Uścieniec [uɕˈt͡ɕɛɲɛt͡s] is a village in the administrative district of Gmina Łaskarzew, within Garwolin County, Masovian Voivodeship, in east-central Poland.
