= Uchacze =

- Village
- Location within Poland
- Coordinates: 51°40′53″N 21°34′03″E
- Country: Poland
- Voivodeship: Masovian
- County: Garwolin
- Gmina: Maciejowice

Uchacze is a village in the administrative district of Gmina Maciejowice, within Garwolin County, Masovian Voivodeship, in east-central Poland.
