= Domaszew-Młyn =

- Settlement
- Location within Poland
- Coordinates: 51°43′02″N 21°30′59″E
- Country: Poland
- Voivodeship: Masovian
- County: Garwolin
- Gmina: Maciejowice

Domaszew-Młyn [dɔˈmaʂɛf ˈmwɨn] is a settlement in the administrative district of Gmina Maciejowice, within Garwolin County, Masovian Voivodeship, in east-central Poland.
