= Nowe Kraski =

- Village
- Location within Poland
- Coordinates: 51°43′36″N 21°26′44″E
- Country: Poland
- Voivodeship: Masovian
- County: Garwolin
- Gmina: Maciejowice

Nowe Kraski [ˈnɔvɛ ˈkraski] is a village in the administrative district of Gmina Maciejowice, within Garwolin County, Masovian Voivodeship, in east-central Poland.
