= Szkółki Krępskie =

- Settlement
- Location within Poland
- Coordinates: 51°44′24″N 21°33′41″E
- Country: Poland
- Voivodeship: Masovian
- County: Garwolin
- Gmina: Maciejowice

Szkółki Krępskie [ˈʂkuu̯ki ˈkrɛmpskʲɛ] is a settlement in the administrative district of Gmina Maciejowice, within Garwolin County, Masovian Voivodeship, in east-central Poland.
