= Topolin, Garwolin County =

Topolin
- Village
- Location within Poland
- Coordinates: 51°42′58″N 21°29′02″E
- Country: Poland
- Voivodeship: Masovian
- County: Garwolin
- Gmina: Maciejowice

Topolin [tɔˈpɔlin] is a Polish village in the administrative district of Gmina Maciejowice. The villages lies within Garwolin County, Masovian Voivodeship, in east-central Poland.
