= Gmina Maciejowice =

Gmina Maciejowice Maciejowice Commune
- Gmina
- Coat of arms

- Location within Poland
- Coordinates (Maciejowice): 51°41′31″N 21°33′16″E
- Country: Poland
- Voivodeship: Masovian
- County: Garwolin
- Seat: Maciejowice

Area
  - Total: 172.67 km^{2} (66.67 sq mi)

Population (2006)
  - Total: 7,287
  - Density: 42.20/km^{2} (109.3/sq mi)
- Website: http://www.maciejowice.pl/

Gmina Maciejowice is a rural gmina (administrative district) in Garwolin County, Masovian Voivodeship, in east-central Poland. Its seat is the village of Maciejowice, which lies approximately 24 kilometres (15 mi) south of Garwolin and 70 km (43 mi) south-east of Warsaw.

The gmina covers an area of 172.67 square kilometres (66.7 sq mi), and as of 2006 its total population is 7,287.

== Villages ==
Gmina Maciejowice contains the villages and settlements of Antoniówka Świerżowska, Antoniówka Wilczkowska, Bączki, Budy Podłęskie, Domaszew, Domaszew-Młyn, Kawęczyn, Kępa Podwierzbiańska, Kobylnica, Kobylnica-Kolonia, Kochów, Kochów-Kępa, Kraski Dolne, Kraski Górne, Leonów, Maciejowice, Malamówka, Nowe Kraski, Oblin, Oblin-Grądki, Oblin-Korczunek, Oronne, Ostrów, Pasternik, Podłęż, Podoblin, Podstolice, Podwierzbie, Podzamcze, Pogorzelec, Polik, Przewóz, Samogoszcz, Strych, Szkółki Krępskie, Topolin, Tyrzyn, Uchacze, Wróble-Wargocin and Zakręty.

== Neighbouring gminas ==
Gmina Maciejowice is bordered by the gminas of Kozienice, Łaskarzew, Magnuszew, Sobolew, Stężyca, Trojanów and Wilga.
