= Podwierzbie, Garwolin County =

Podwierzbie
- Village
- Location within Poland
- Coordinates: 51°44′49″N 21°26′46″E
- Country: Poland
- Voivodeship: Masovian
- County: Garwolin
- Gmina: Maciejowice

Podwierzbie [pɔdˈvjɛʐbjɛ] is a village in the administrative district of Gmina Maciejowice, within Garwolin County, Masovian Voivodeship, in east-central Poland.
