= Pogorzelec, Garwolin County =

Pogorzelec
- Village
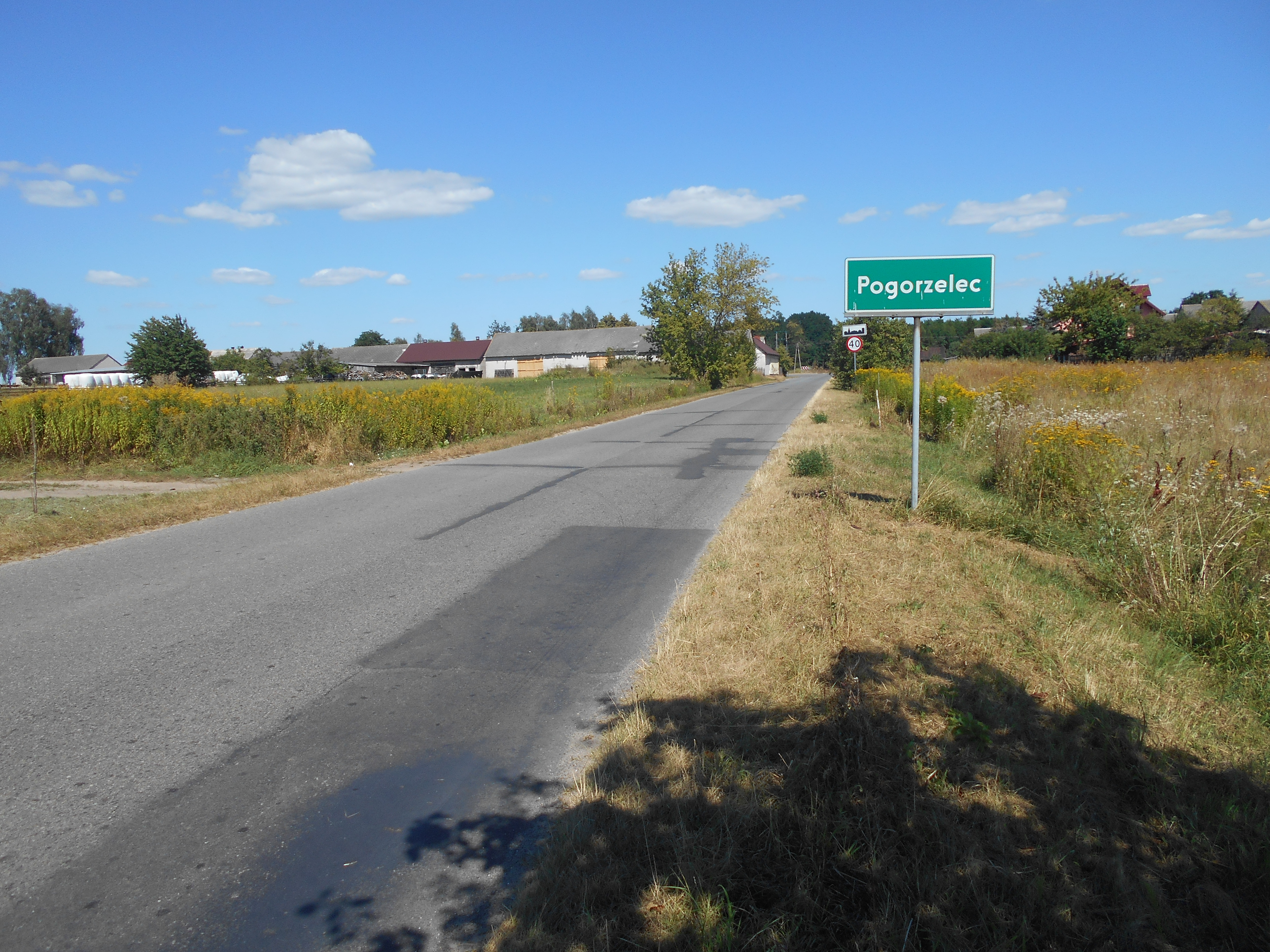

- Location within Poland
- Coordinates: 51°43′49″N 21°35′12″E
- Country: Poland
- Voivodeship: Masovian
- County: Garwolin
- Gmina: Maciejowice
- Time zone: UTC+1 (CET)
  - Summer (DST): UTC+2 (CEST)

Pogorzelec [pɔɡɔˈʐɛlɛt͡s] is a village in the administrative district of Gmina Maciejowice, within Garwolin County, Masovian Voivodeship, in east-central Poland.

Five Polish citizens were murdered by Nazi Germany in the village during World War II.
