= Przewóz, Garwolin County =

Przewóz
- Village
- Location within Poland
- Coordinates: 51°40′34″N 21°31′28″E
- Country: Poland
- Voivodeship: Masovian
- County: Garwolin
- Gmina: Maciejowice
- Time zone: UTC+1 (CET)
  - Summer (DST): UTC+2 (CEST)

Przewóz [ˈpʂɛvus] is a village in the administrative district of Gmina Maciejowice, within Garwolin County, Masovian Voivodeship, in east-central Poland.

Five Polish citizens were murdered by Nazi Germany in the village during World War II.
