= Gmina Wilga =

Gmina Wilga Wilga Commune
- Gmina
- Coat of arms
- Interactive map of Gmina Wilga
- Coordinates (Wilga): 51°51′11″N 21°22′45″E
- Country: Poland
- Voivodeship: Masovian
- County: Garwolin
- Seat: Wilga

Area
  - Total: 119.13 km^{2} (46.00 sq mi)

Population (2006)
  - Total: 5,262
  - Density: 44.17/km^{2} (114.4/sq mi)

Gmina Wilga is a rural gmina (administrative district) in Garwolin County, Masovian Voivodeship, in east-central Poland. Its seat is the village of Wilga, which lies approximately 17 kilometres (10 mi) south-west of Garwolin and 49 km (30 mi) south-east of Warsaw.

The gmina covers an area of 119.13 square kilometres (46.0 sq mi), and as of 2006 its total population is 5,262.

== Villages ==
Gmina Wilga contains the villages and settlements of Celejów, Cyganówka, Goźlin Górny, Goźlin Mały, Holendry, Malinówka, Mariańskie Porzecze, Nieciecz, Nowe Podole, Nowy Żabieniec, Ostrybór, Ruda Tarnowska, Skurcza, Stare Podole, Stary Żabieniec, Tarnów, Trzcianka, Uścieniec-Kolonia, Wicie, Wilga, Wólka Gruszczyńska and Zakrzew.

== Neighbouring gminas ==
Gmina Wilga is bordered by the gminas of Garwolin, Łaskarzew, Maciejowice, Magnuszew, Sobienie-Jeziory and Warka.
