= Wanaty, Masovian Voivodeship =

Wanaty
- Village
- Location within Poland
- Coordinates: 51°48′N 21°30′E
- Country: Poland
- Voivodeship: Masovian
- County: Garwolin
- Gmina: Łaskarzew
- Time zone: UTC+1 (CET)
  - Summer (DST): UTC+2 (CEST)
- Vehicle registration: WG

Wanaty [vaˈnatɨ] is a village in the administrative district of Gmina Łaskarzew, within Garwolin County, Masovian Voivodeship, in east-central Poland.

During the German occupation of Poland in World War II, units of Schutzpolizei and Sonderdienst, led by Kreishauptmann Karl Freudenthal "pacified" the village and brutally murdered 108 inhabitants.
