= Oksana Kovalevskaya =

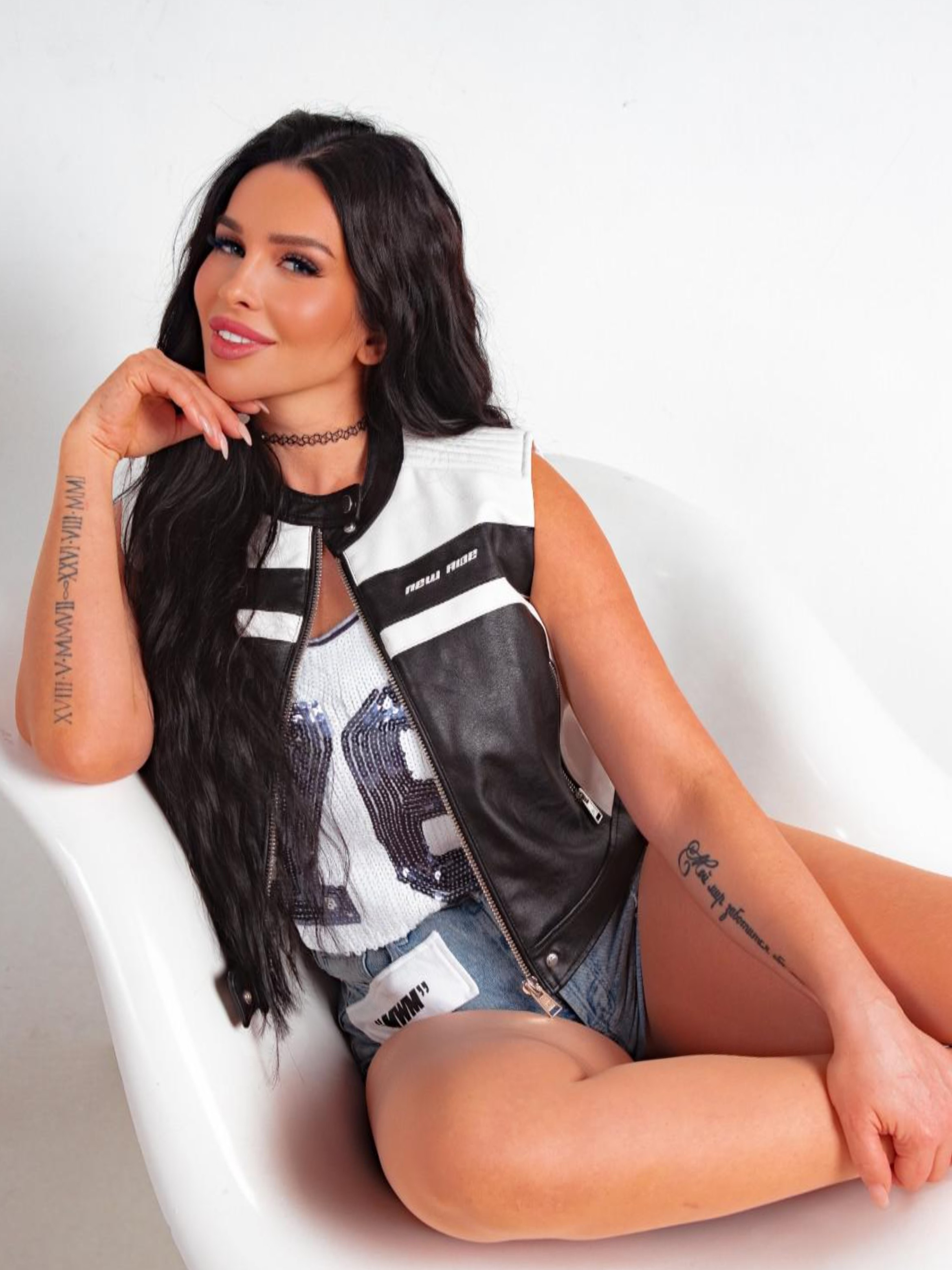

Background information
- Occupation: singer
- Instrument: Vocals
- Years active: 2001–present
- Website: http://www.oksanakraski.ru/

Oksana Kovalevskaya (Russian: Оксана Ковалевская) is the lead singer of the Belarusian band Kraski ("Paints"), where she released five albums, each with a different color theme.

== Career ==
In 2001, she released the single "Today I Went Home to Mother" (Russian: Сегодня к маме я пиехала домой), and her first album You're an Adult. As part of their promotions outside of Belarus, she worked with Real Records to release her album in Russia. By then, she started using a color-based theme for her albums, and the name of her touring band was Kraski (Russian: краски). Her debut album was thus released as the Yellow album – Big Brother (Russian: Желтый альбом (Старший брат)). In 2002, she released her second single, "He doesn't know anything" (Russian: Он не знает ничего), which is about a bandit. After the tour concluded, she released her third single "I love you Joe". In January 2003, she released her fourth single, "My Mother" (Russian: Мамочка моя), which is about a grown-up girl who wonder what's next.

Paints returned to the studio to record their second album, which uses the red color theme. Kovalevskaya released her third Kraski album with an orange color theme. In 2004, Kovalevskaya released her fourth Kraski album with a blue color theme.

Her fifth album had a purple color theme. Its title track, "Those who love" (Russian: Те, кто любит), was a duet with Russian pop singer Andrey Gubin. The album continued to show her mature side. Kraski expanded its 2005 tour to cities and countries they have not been to before. In 2005–2006 they traveled to England, Germany, the Netherlands, Austria, Hungary, Ireland and the United States. Kovalevskaya also lived in the United States for about a year, until she was pregnant with her second child.

In 2010, Kraski disbanded.

== Discography ==
This is a list of her albums and prominent singles.

=== Studio albums ===
Kraski

- Yellow album – Big Brother (Russian: Желтый альбом (Старший брат)) (originally released as You're an Adult in 2001) (2002)
- Red album – I love you Sergey (Russian: Красный альбом (Я люблю тебя, Сергей!)) (2003)
- Orange album – Orange Sun (Russian: Оранжевый альбом (Оранжевое солнце)) (2003)
- Blue album – Spring (Russian: Синий альбом (Весна)) (2004)
- Purple album – Those Who Love (Russian: Фиолетовый альбом (Те,кто любит))(2004)

Solo

- Spring in the Heart (Russian: Весна в сердце) (2013)

=== Singles ===
Paints

- "Today I Arrived Home to Mom" (Russian: Сегодня к маме я приехала домой) (2001)
- "He Doesn't Know Anything" (Russian: Он не знает ничего) (2002)
- "Elder Brother" (Russian: Старший брат) (2002)
- "My Mother" (Russian: Мамочка моя) (2003)
- "I Love You, Sergey" (Russian: Я люблю тебя, Сергей) (2003)
- "Orange Sun" (Russian: Оранжевое солнце) (2003)
- "Just Fifteen Years" (Russian: Всего пятнадцать лет) (2003)
- "Elder Brother part.2" (Russian: Старший брат 2) (2004)
- "Spring" (Russian: Весна) (2004)
- "Those Who Love" (Russian: Те, кто любит) (with Andrey Gubin) (2004)
- "Boy" (Russian: Мальчик) (2004)
- "Don't Say" (Russian: Не говори) (2004)
- "I'll Be Waiting" (Russian: Я буду ждать) (2004)
- "Sea" (Russian: Море) (2005)
- "Boy with Postcards" (Russian: Мальчик с открытки) (2006)
- "Late" (Russian: Поздно) (2007)

Solo

- "You Are For Me" (Russian: Ты для меня) (2012)
- "Game Without Rules" (Russian: Игра без правил) (2012)
- "Leave" (Russian: Оставь) (2012)
- "I'm Running" (Russian: Я убегаю) (2012)
- "Race" (Russian: Гонка) (2012)
- "Happy New Year!" (Russian: С Новым годом!) (2013)
- "Paradise" (Russian: Рай) (2013)
- "Girl Wants" (Russian: А девочке хочется) (2013)
- "You Ocean Of Light" (Russian: Ты океан света) (2013)
- "Spring in the Heart" (Russian: Весну в Сердце) (2013)
- "Loveless" (Russian: Без любви) (2013)
- "I'm Playing in Love" (Russian: I'm Playing in Love) (2013)
- "About U" (Russian: О тебе) (2013)
