= Kraski Górne =

- Village
- Location within Poland
- Coordinates: 51°43′N 21°28′E
- Country: Poland
- Voivodeship: Masovian
- County: Garwolin
- Gmina: Maciejowice
- Population: 75

Kraski Górne [ˈkraski ˈɡurnɛ] is a village in the administrative district of Gmina Maciejowice, within Garwolin County, Masovian Voivodeship, in east-central Poland.
