= Górzno, Masovian Voivodeship =

Górzno
- Village
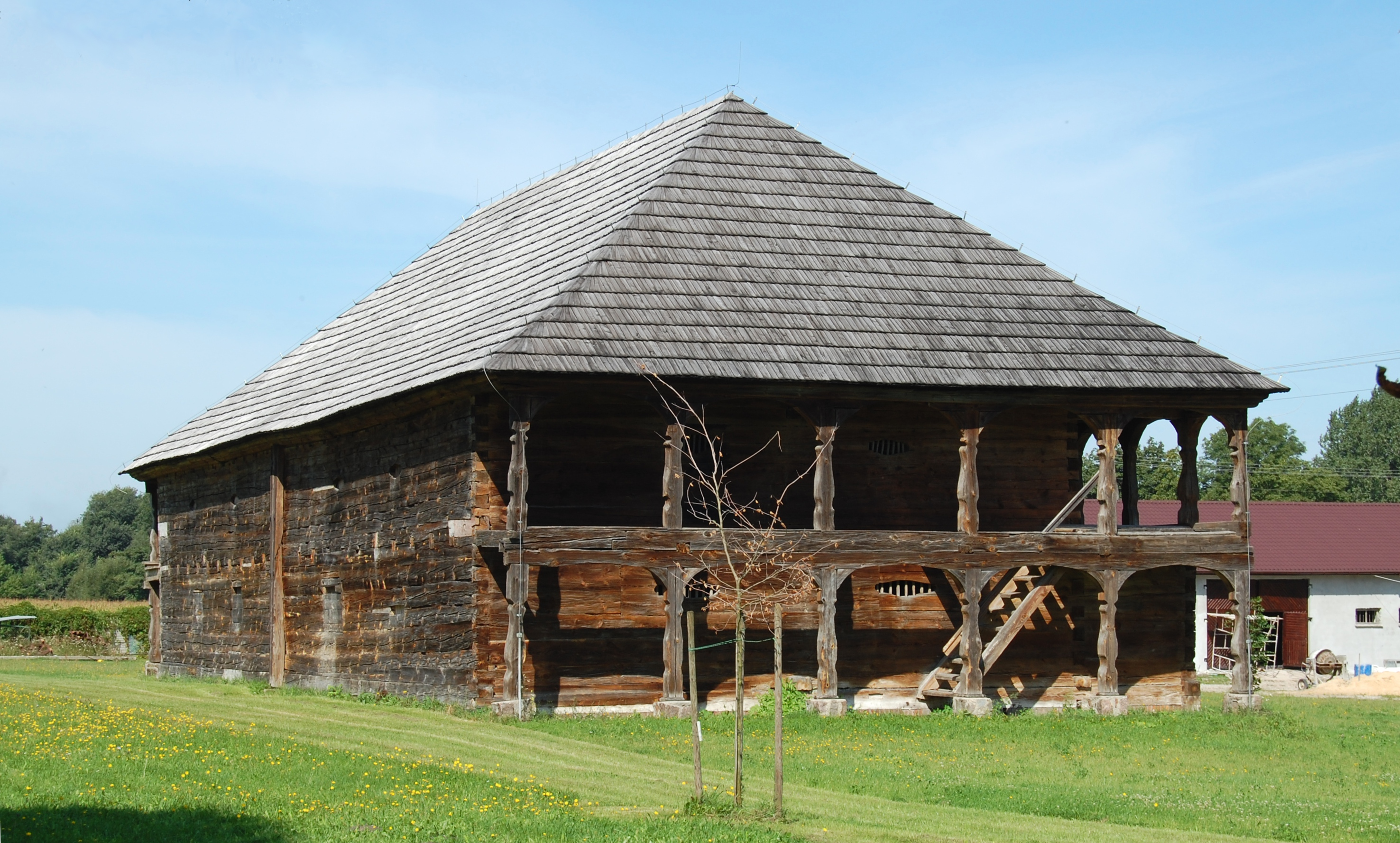
- 18th century granary in Górzno

- Location within Poland
- Coordinates: 51°50′45″N 21°42′54″E
- Country: Poland
- Voivodeship: Masovian
- County: Garwolin
- Gmina: Górzno

Górzno [ˈɡuʐnɔ] is a village in Garwolin County, Masovian Voivodeship, in east-central Poland. It is the seat of the gmina (administrative district) called Gmina Górzno.
