= Kobylnica, Masovian Voivodeship =

Kobylnica
- Village
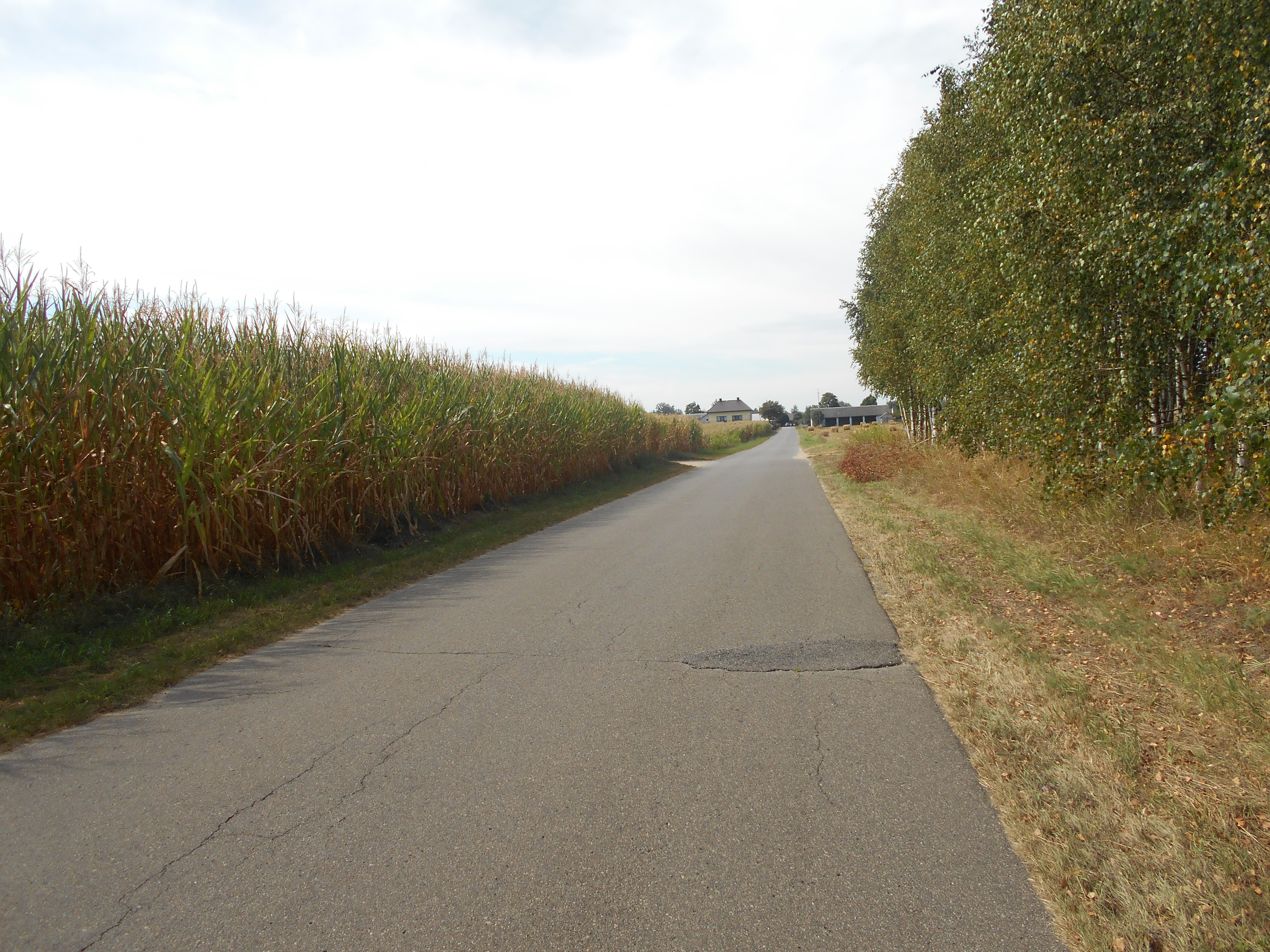

- Location within Poland
- Coordinates: 51°39′6″N 21°34′18″E
- Country: Poland
- Voivodeship: Masovian
- County: Garwolin
- Gmina: Maciejowice

Population
  - Total: 522
- Time zone: UTC+1 (CET)
  - Summer (DST): UTC+2 (CEST)
- Vehicle registration: WG

Kobylnica [kɔbɨlˈnit͡sa] is a village in the administrative district of Gmina Maciejowice, within Garwolin County, Masovian Voivodeship, in east-central Poland.
