= Wilga, Masovian Voivodeship =

Wilga
- Village
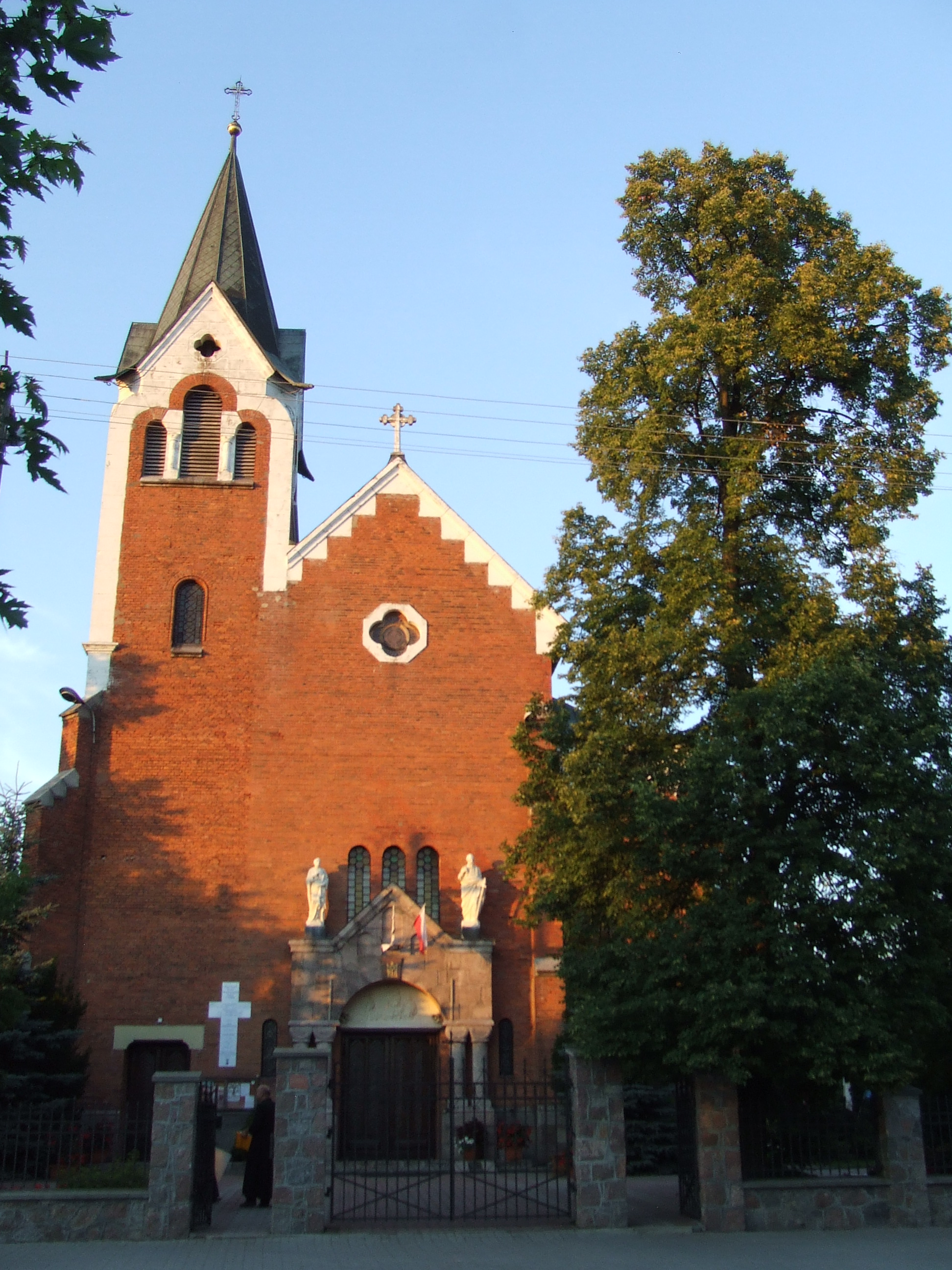
- Assumption church

- Coat of arms

- Location within Poland
- Coordinates: 51°51′11″N 21°22′45″E
- Country: Poland
- Voivodeship: Masovian
- County: Garwolin
- Gmina: Wilga
- Population (approx.): 1,000

Wilga [ˈvilɡa] is a village in Garwolin County, Masovian Voivodeship, in east-central Poland. It is the seat of the gmina (administrative district) called Gmina Wilga.

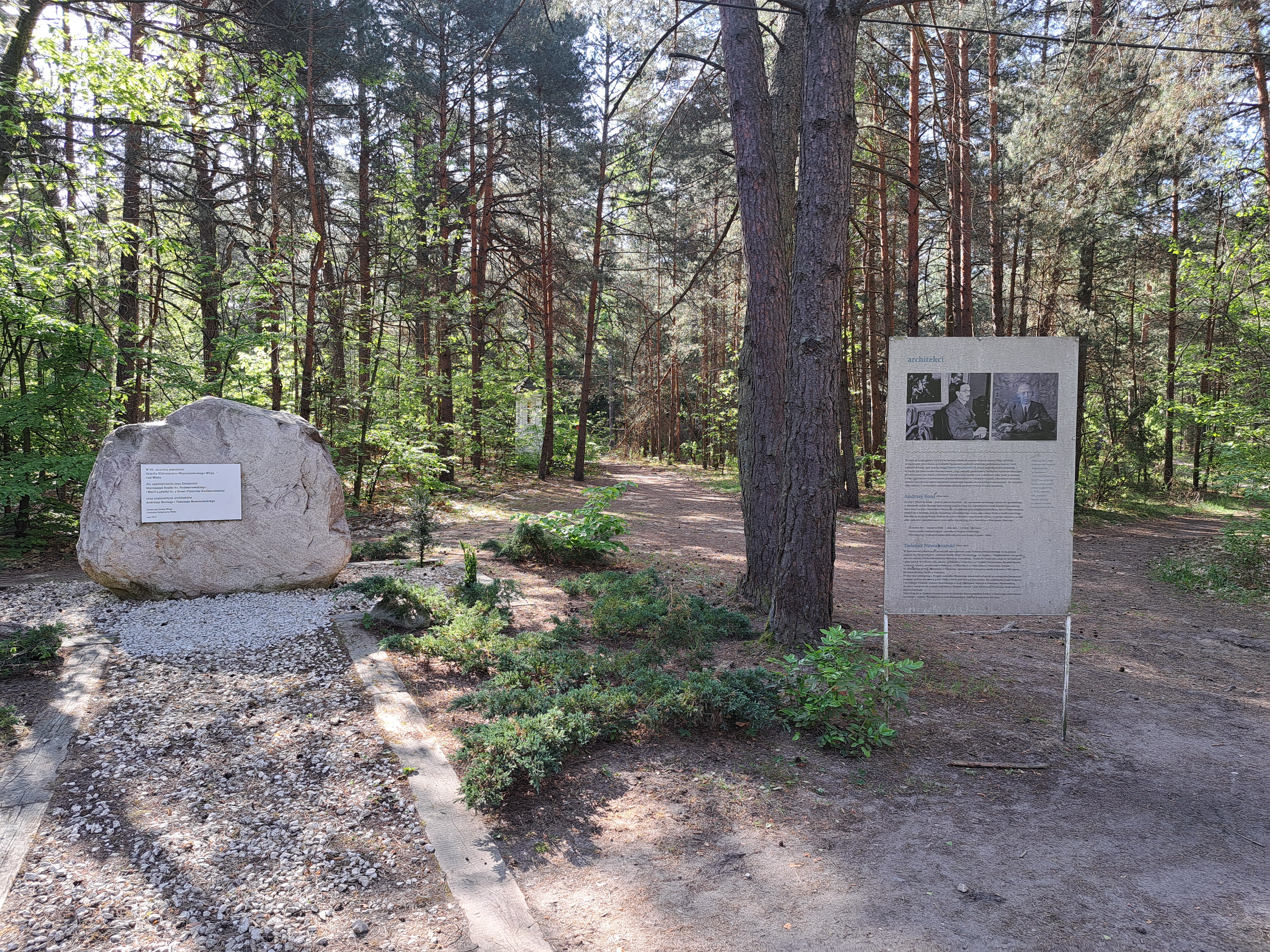
Monuments in Osieldle Wilga
