= Gmina Łaskarzew =

Gmina Łaskarzew Łaskarzew Commune
- Gmina
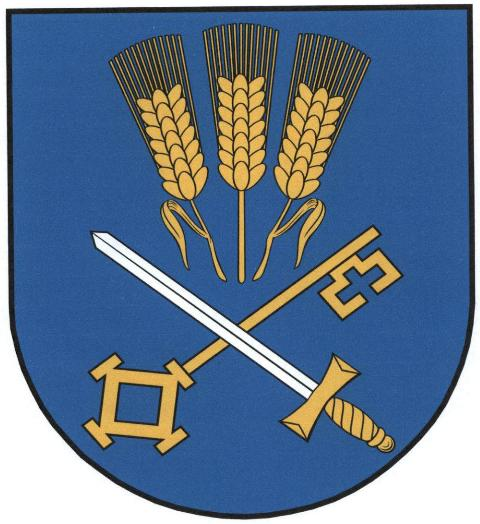
- Coat of arms
- Interactive map of Gmina Łaskarzew
- Coordinates (Łaskarzew): 51°47′24″N 21°35′33″E
- Country: Poland
- Voivodeship: Masovian
- County: Garwolin
- Seat: Łaskarzew

Area
  - Total: 87.53 km^{2} (33.80 sq mi)

Population (2006)
  - Total: 5,541
  - Density: 63.30/km^{2} (164.0/sq mi)
- Website: http://www.laskarzew.pl/

Gmina Łaskarzew is a rural gmina (administrative district) in Garwolin County, Masovian Voivodeship, in east-central Poland. Its seat is the town of Łaskarzew, although the town is not part of the territory of the gmina.

The gmina covers an area of 87.53 square kilometres (33.8 sq mi), and as of 2006 its total population is 5,541.

== Villages ==
Gmina Łaskarzew contains the villages and settlements of Aleksandrów, Budel, Budy Krępskie, Celinów, Dąbrowa, Dąbrowa-Kolonia, Grabina, Izdebno, Izdebno-Kolonia, Kacprówek, Krzywda, Ksawerynów, Leokadia, Lewików, Lipniki, Melanów, Nowy Helenów, Nowy Pilczyn, Polesie Rowskie, Rowy, Sośninka, Stary Helenów, Stary Pilczyn, Uścieniec, Wanaty, Wola Łaskarzewska, Wola Rowska and Zygmunty.

== Neighbouring gminas ==
Gmina Łaskarzew is bordered by the town of Łaskarzew and by the gminas of Garwolin, Górzno, Maciejowice, Sobolew and Wilga.
