= Gmina Górzno, Masovian Voivodeship =

Gmina Górzno Górzno Commune
- Gmina
- Flag Coat of arms

- Coordinates (Górzno): 51°50′45″N 21°42′54″E
- Country: Poland
- Voivodeship: Masovian
- County: Garwolin
- Seat: Górzno

Area
  - Total: 90.84 km^{2} (35.07 sq mi)

Population (2006)
  - Total: 6,112
  - Density: 67.28/km^{2} (174.3/sq mi)
- Website: http://gorzno.ugm.pl/

Gmina Górzno is a rural gmina (administrative district) in Garwolin County, Masovian Voivodeship, in east-central Poland. Its seat is the village of Górzno, which lies approximately 8 kilometres (5 mi) south-east of Garwolin and 64 km (40 mi) south-east of Warsaw.

The gmina covers an area of 90.84 square kilometres (35.1 sq mi), and as of 2006 its total population is 6,112.

== Villages ==
Gmina Górzno contains the villages and settlements of Chęciny, Gąsów, Górzno, Górzno-Kolonia, Goździk, Józefów, Kobyla Wola, Łąki, Mierzączka, Piaski, Potaszniki, Reducin, Samorządki, Unin and Wólka Ostrożeńska.

== Neighbouring gminas ==
Gmina Górzno is bordered by the town of Garwolin and by the gminas of Borowie, Garwolin, Łaskarzew, Miastków Kościelny, Sobolew and Żelechów.
