= Podstolice, Masovian Voivodeship =

Podstolice
- Village
- Location within Poland
- Coordinates: 51°41′57″N 21°29′16″E
- Country: Poland
- Voivodeship: Masovian
- County: Garwolin
- Gmina: Maciejowice

Podstolice [pɔtstɔˈlit͡sɛ] is a village in the administrative district of Gmina Maciejowice, within Garwolin County, Masovian Voivodeship, in east-central Poland.
