= Karl Freudenthal =

Karl Freudenthal (8 June 1907 – 5 July 1944) was a German lawyer, a Nazi and an officer of the Schutzstaffel. In 1941 he was made a Kreishauptmann of powiat Garwolin in German occupied Poland. He was a relative of Hans Frank, the Governor-General of the General Government.

In January 1941, as one of his first actions in his new post, he oversaw the removal of the Jewish population of the town of Garwolin and their transfer to the ghettos of Żelechów, Sobolew, Łaskarzew and Parysów. Between that date and end of 1942, acting on his orders, the Gestapo and other German police forces murdered 890 people from the town of Garwolin and the surrounding area. Another 2100 individuals were sent to Nazi concentration camps and for slave labor in Nazi Germany. On 28 February he personally led units of Schutzpolizei and Sonderdienst in the "pacification" of the village Wanaty, during which 108 inhabitants were murdered.

In late 1942 or early 1943 the Government Delegation for Poland, the underground representative of the Polish Government-in-Exile, sentenced Freudenthal to death for crimes against the Polish and Jewish populations of Garwolin. The sentence was carried out on 5 July 1944 by two units of the Polish Home Army, numbering twenty men, from Garwolin and the nearby village of Wola Rębkowska. Freudenthal's execution was part of the Home Army's Operation Heads.
