= Risk reduction =

Risk reduction may refer to:

Health

- Absolute risk reduction or relative risk reduction, statistical descriptors of an intervention.
- Harm reduction, in public health

General

- Risk management
- Disaster risk reduction
- Safety integrity level

Finance

- Hedge (finance)
- Diversification (finance)
