= Kraski (band) =

Belarusian pop/Eurodance band

- Origin: Minsk, Belarus
- Genres: Pop, Eurodance
- Years active: 2001–present
- Label: Real Line Music
- Members: Dasha Subbotina; Denis Barvinok; Vitaly Kondrakov
- Past members: Ekaterina Borovik; Oxana Kovalevskaya; Vasily Bogomya; Andrei Chighir; Dmitry Orlovsky; Katya Sasha
- Website: gruppakraski.ru

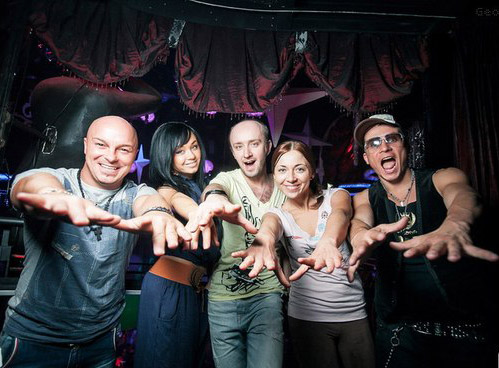
Kraski in 2012

Kraski (Russian: Краски, lit.: «Paints») is a Russian-language pop / Eurodance musical band from Belarus.

The band was formed on 1 January 2001, in Minsk, and since 2003 is based in Moscow. Kraski launched five studio albums in the early 2000s, time in which the band had a big popularity in Russia and CIS, with many songs in tops of the musical charts. Band producer and songwriter is Alexey Voronov.

In 2011, their single "Старший брат" ("Starshiy Brat", Elder Brother) was included in a list by Afisha magazine as one of the most remarkable and memorable hits of the latest 20 years in Russian music.

== Discography ==
=== Albums ===
Year	Russian title	Translation	Information
2002	Старший брат: жёлтый альбом (Starshiy Brat: Zheltiy Al'bom)	Elder Brother: The Yellow Album	first released in November 2001 as Ты уже взрослый (Ty Uzhe Vzroslyi) / You're Grown-Up Now
2003	Я люблю тебя, Сергей: красный альбом (Ya Lyublyu Tebya, Sergey: Krasniy Al'bom)	I Love You, Sergey: The Red Album	
2003	Оранжевое солнце: оранжевый альбом (Oranzhevoye Solnce: Oranzheviy Al'bom)	Orange Sun: The Orange Album	
2004	Весна: синий альбом (Vesna: Siniy Al'bom)	Spring: The Blue Album	
2004	Те, кто любит: фиолетовый альбом (Te, Kto Lyubit: Fioletoviy Al'bom)	Those Who Love: The Purple Album	

=== Collaborative projects ===
- 2001: Kraski & YAK-40 — Ты у меня одна / Ty U Menya Odna / You're My Only One
- 2003: Kraski & Viza Nezalezhnay Respubliki Mroya — Тры чарапахі / Tri Charapakhi / Three Turtles
- 2004: Kraski & Andrey Gubin — Те, кто любит / Te, Kto Lyubit / Those Who Love

== Members ==
=== Current members ===
- Dasha Subbotina: vocal
- Vitali Kondrakov: keyboards
- Denis Barvinok: keyboards

=== Former members ===
- Ekaterina (Katya) Borovik: vocal, 2001
- Oksana Kovalevskaya: vocal, 2002–2006
- Vasily Bogomya: keyboards, 2001–2003
- Andrei Chighir: keyboards, 2001–2003
- Dmitry Orlovsky: keyboards, 2003–2006
- Katya Sasha: vocal 2006–2011

== Literature ==
- Д.П. (2008). "«КРАСКИ»". Энцыклапедыя беларускай папулярнай музыкі. уклад. Дз. Падбярэзскі і інш (2000 экз ed.). Мінск: Zmicier Kołas. pp. 144–145. ISBN 978-985-6783-42-8.
