= Garwolin County =

Garwolin County Powiat garwoliński
- County
- Flag Coat of arms

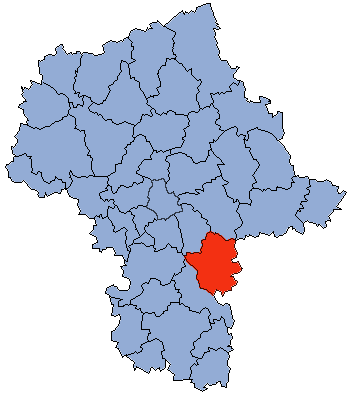
- Location within the voivodeship

- Division into gminas
- Coordinates (Garwolin): 51°54′N 21°38′E
- Country: Poland
- Voivodeship: Masovian
- Seat: Garwolin
- Gminas: Total 14 (incl. 2 urban): Garwolin; Łaskarzew; Gmina Borowie; Gmina Garwolin; Gmina Górzno; Gmina Łaskarzew; Gmina Maciejowice; Gmina Miastków Kościelny; Gmina Parysów; Gmina Pilawa; Gmina Sobolew; Gmina Trojanów; Gmina Wilga; Gmina Żelechów

Area
  - Total: 1,284.29 km^{2} (495.87 sq mi)

Population (2019)
  - Total: 104,917
  - Density: 81.6926/km^{2} (211.583/sq mi)
  - Urban: 30,907
  - Rural: 74,010
- Car plates: WG
- Website: www.garwolin-starostwo.pl

Garwolin County (Polish: powiat garwoliński) is a unit of territorial administration and local government (powiat) in Masovian Voivodeship, east-central Poland. It came into being on 1 January 1999, as a result of the Polish local government reforms passed in 1998. Its administrative seat and largest town is Garwolin, which lies 56 kilometres (35 mi) south-east of Warsaw. The county contains three other towns: Łaskarzew, 13 km (8 mi) south of Garwolin, Pilawa, 10 km (6 mi) north-west of Garwolin, and Żelechów, 22 km (14 mi) south-east of Garwolin.

The county covers an area of 1,284.29 square kilometres (495.9 sq mi). As of 2019 its total population is 104,917, out of which the population of Garwolin is 17,501, that of Łaskarzew is 4,840, that of Pilawa is 4,578, that of Żelechów is 3,988, and the rural population is 74,010.

== Neighbouring counties ==
Garwolin County is bordered by Mińsk County to the north, Siedlce County to the north-east, Łuków County to the east, Ryki County to the south-east, Kozienice County to the south, Grójec County to the west and Otwock County to the north-west.

== Administrative divisions ==
The county is subdivided into 14 gminas (two urban, two urban-rural and 10 rural). These are listed in the following table, in descending order of population.

Gmina	Type	Area (km^{2})	Population (2019)	Seat
Garwolin	urban	22.1	17,501	
Gmina Garwolin	rural	136.0	13,237	Garwolin *
Gmina Pilawa	urban-rural	77.3	10,984	Pilawa
Gmina Żelechów	urban-rural	87.6	8,318	Żelechów
Gmina Sobolew	rural	94.8	8,272	Sobolew
Gmina Trojanów	rural	151.0	7,318	Trojanów
Gmina Maciejowice	rural	172.7	6,942	Maciejowice
Gmina Łaskarzew	rural	87.5	5,471	Łaskarzew *
Gmina Wilga	rural	119.1	5,303	Wilga
Gmina Borowie	rural	80.4	5,237	Borowie
Gmina Miastków Kościelny	rural	85.2	4,861	Miastków Kościelny
Łaskarzew	urban	15.1	4,840	
Gmina Parysów	rural	64.3	4,097	Parysów
Gmina Górzno	rural	90.8	2,536	Górzno
* seat not part of the gmina
