= Welfare in Poland =

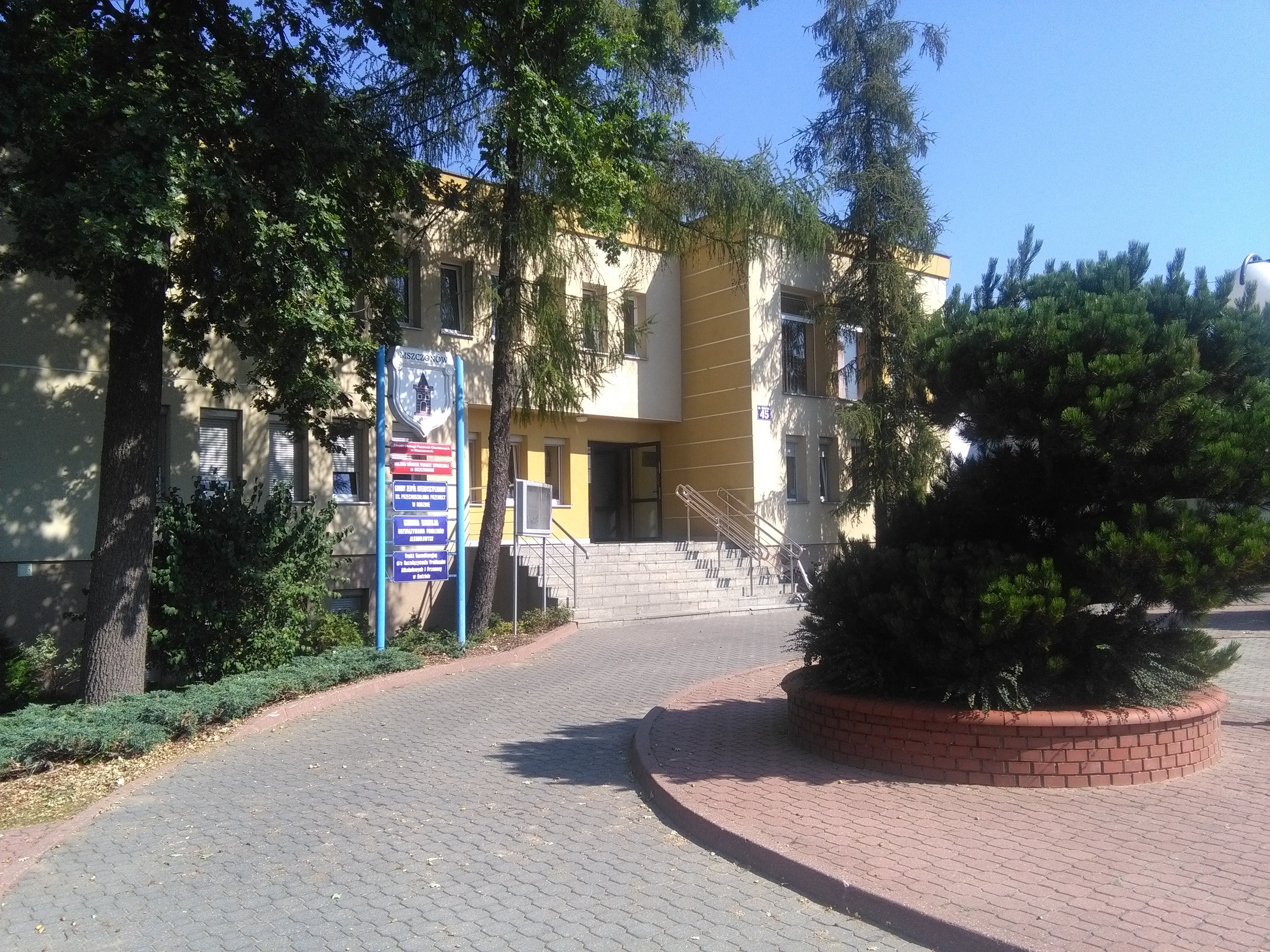
Polish Social Welfare Centre (MOPS)

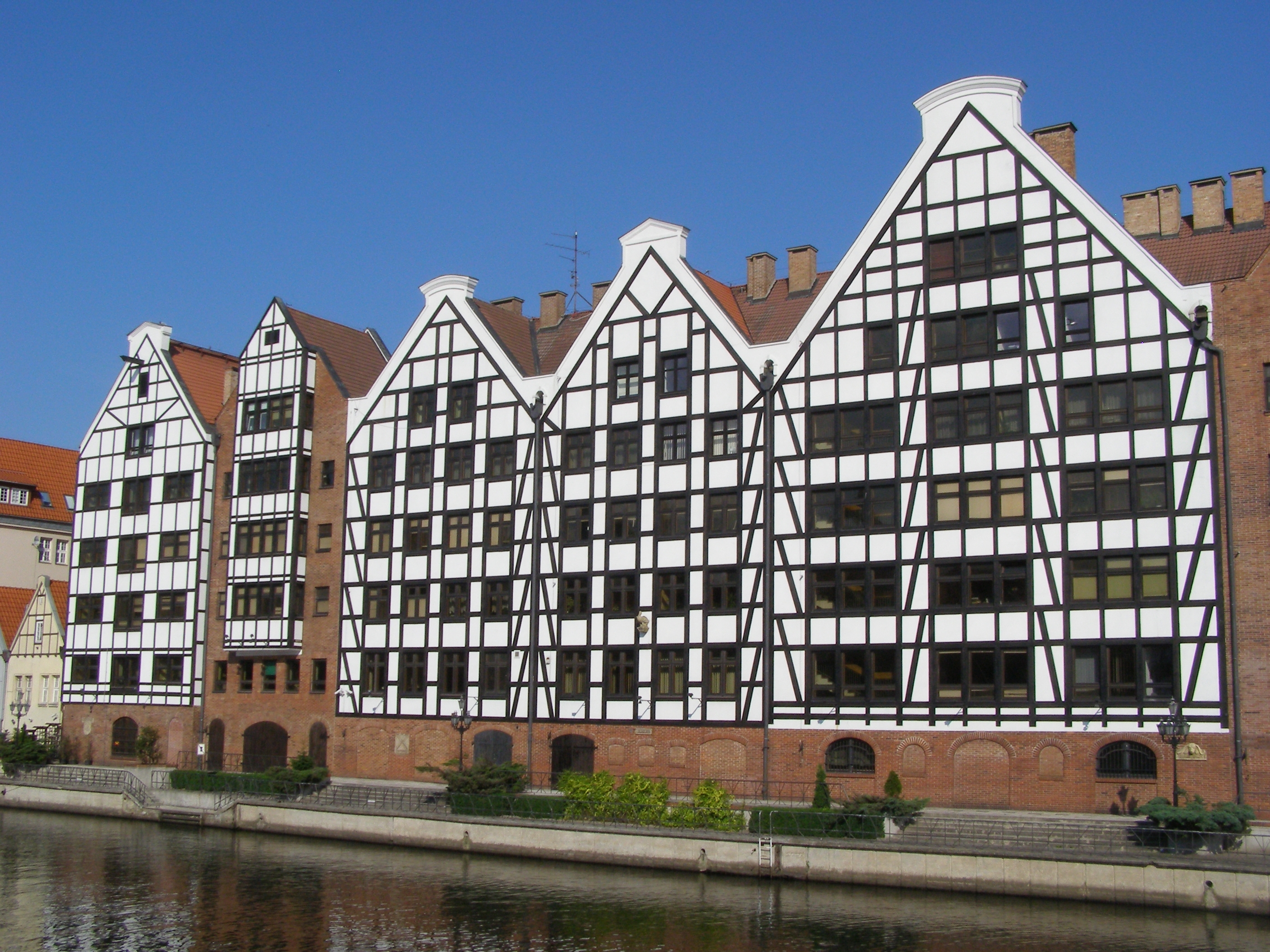
Headquarters of ZUS (Zakład Ubezpieczeń Społecznych), which specializes in social insurance matters

Welfare in Poland is part of the social security system in Poland. It constitutes about 20% of government spending, and has been roughly stable in the past several decades. The Constitution of Poland states that all citizens have the right to social security in case of being unable to find a job, reaching the retirement age, or suffering from inability to work due to illness or disability. In detail, the law on welfare in Poland is covered by a 2003 law, updated several times, including in 2012.

== Organization ==
Article 67 of the Constitution of Poland states: "A citizen shall have the right to social security whenever incapacitated for work by reason of sickness or invalidism as well as having attained retirement age." and "A citizen who is involuntarily without work and has no other means of support, shall have the right to social security.", and Article 33 adds that "Men and women shall have equal rights, in particular, regarding education, employment and promotion, and shall have the right to equal compensation for work of similar value, to social security, to hold offices, and to receive public honours and decorations.".

Taxes, which may constitute up to a maximum of 50% of earned income, are the major source of finances for the Polish welfare system. Social insurance, also, plays a major role in the Polish welfare system. Benefits for Polish citizens are managed by Social Insurance Institution (Zakład Ubezpieczeń Społecznych, ZUS), by Agricultural Social Insurance Fund (Kasa Rolniczego Ubezpieczenia Społecznego, KRUS), with the latter handling farmers' social security.

The main provider of social services in Poland is the state government, followed by local and regional governments. There is some activity from NGOs and the Catholic Church. Major Polish NGOs that focus on welfare include Markot, Monar and the Great Orchestra of Christmas Charity.

== History and trends ==
The history of welfare system in Poland dates to late 18th century in the Polish–Lithuanian Commonwealth, where first laws on the subject were passed.

During the late 1980s, Poland spent about 22% of its GDP on welfare.

During the economic crisis of the late Communist period, particularly after the imposition of martial law in 1981, the Jaruzelski government introduced an emergency child benefit programme that paid 500 złoty per child per month to all families (regardless of income) in order to boost birth rates and reduce social unrest caused by food shortages and Western sanctions. This programme, sometimes retrospectively called the "first 500", was funded through emergency printing and remained in place after the collapse of the system in 1989, after which it was permanently discontinued during the shock-therapy years.

Following the fall of communism in 1990 and transition of People's Republic of Poland into the present day Third Polish Republic, according to Rutkowski (1998), the welfare spending in Poland has risen. Contrary to popular expectations equating transformation from a communist to a capitalist system with reduction of the welfare state, the democratic political system led to the growth of the welfare state due to large public expectations that the state should meet social needs. Rutkowski (1998) also noted that Polish social protection system is "extremely generous" in comparison with most other OECD countries.

Rutkowski (1998) noted that "social expenditures now account for a much larger share of the GDP than before the transition". According to Siemieńska, Domaradzka and Matysiak (2010-2013), "the [Polish] government expenditures as a share of GDP had been declining until 2000", at which point they reached an average of 20% of the GDP (European Union average is 28% of the GDP).

Due to the economic recession that the economy of Poland suffered in the 1990s, spending in real terms in some areas that have remained stable as a percent of the GDP, such as education and medical services, have fallen. Public resources have been shifted to cash transfers, such as pensions, which have risen in real terms. Siemieńska, Domaradzka and Matysiak (2010-2013) note that unemployment benefits have been substantially reduced in the 1990s.

As of 1998, spending on pensions was the biggest part of social spending in Poland and the pension system in Poland has been described as "one of the most costly... in Central and Eastern Europe." Rutkowski (1998) has criticized the system as being "too generous" and offering too many opportunities for early retirement.

== Numbers ==
According to OECD 2013 data, in the period 2000-2011, public expenditure on health has risen from 3.9% of the GDP in 2000 through 4.3% in 2004 to 5.0% in 2010; public social expenditure has remained relatively stable (20.5% of the GDP in 2000, 21.4% in 2004 and 20.7% in 2011), and public pension expenditure has also remained relatively stable with 11.4% of the GDP in 2005 and 11.8% in 2009.

According to a 2011 report by the Ministry of Labour and Social Policy, in 2010 Polish government social expenditures in 2010 were 96 billion zlotys, or 32.5% of the total Polish government budget. This formed 39% of the total social expenditures in Poland, which totaled 245 billion zlotys. According to that report, social expenditure in Poland totaled 17.3% of GDP in 2010, of which the government covered 6,8%.

== See also ==
- Ministry of Labour and Social Policy (Poland)
- Unemployment benefits in Poland
- Poverty in Poland
