= Poverty in Poland =

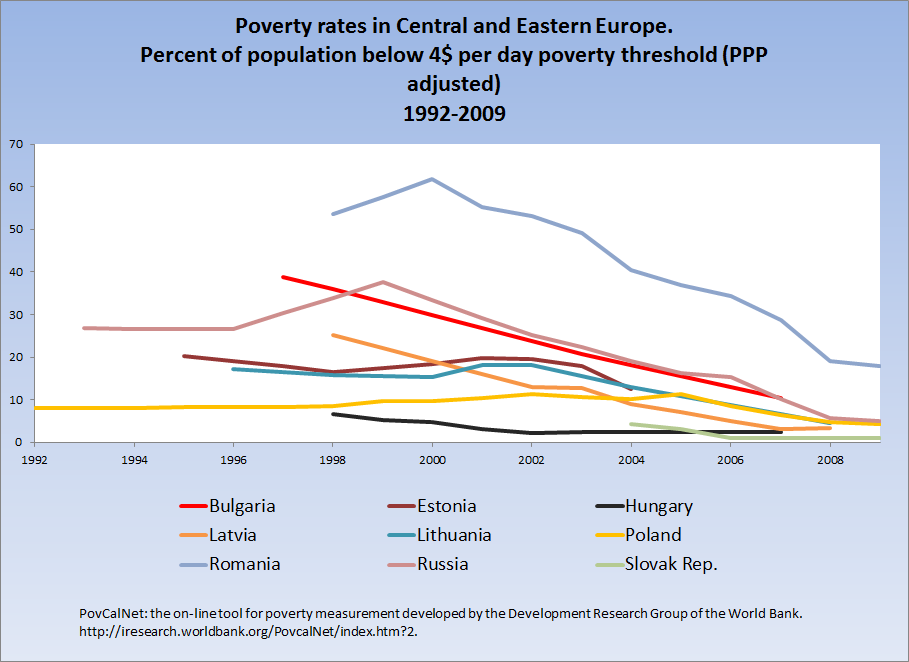
Poverty Headcount (% of population) living at below $4 (purchasing power adjusted) per day in Central and Eastern Europe, 1992-2009 (missing years were linearly interpolated). Poland is represented by the yellow line.

Poverty in Poland has been relatively stable in the past decades, affecting (depending on measure) about 6.5% of the society. In the last decade there has been a lowering trend, as in general Polish society is becoming wealthier and the economy is enjoying one of the highest growth rates in Europe. There have been noticeable increases in poverty around the turns of the decades, offset by decreases in poverty in the years following those periods.

== History and trends ==
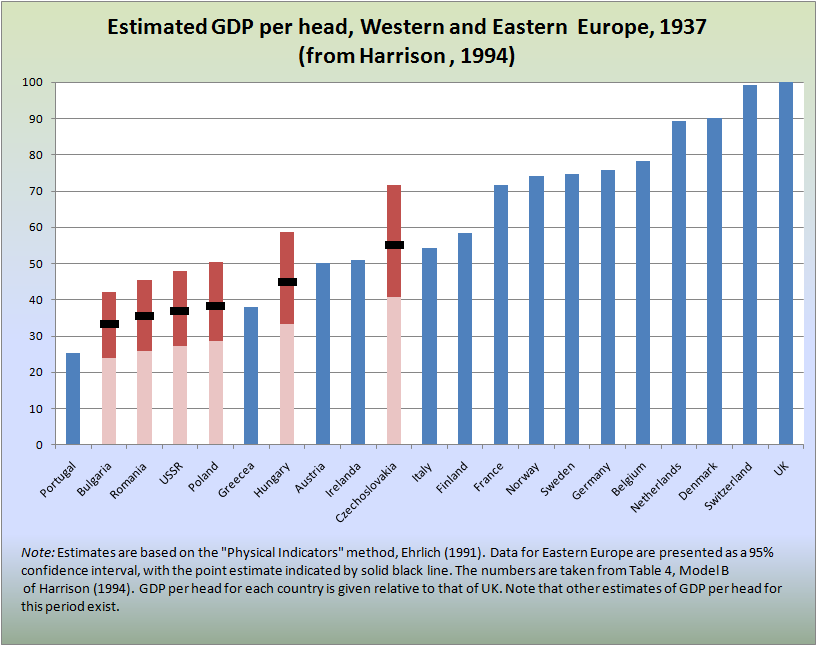
GDP per capita estimates for Western and Eastern Europe for 1937, as percent of UK GDP per capita.

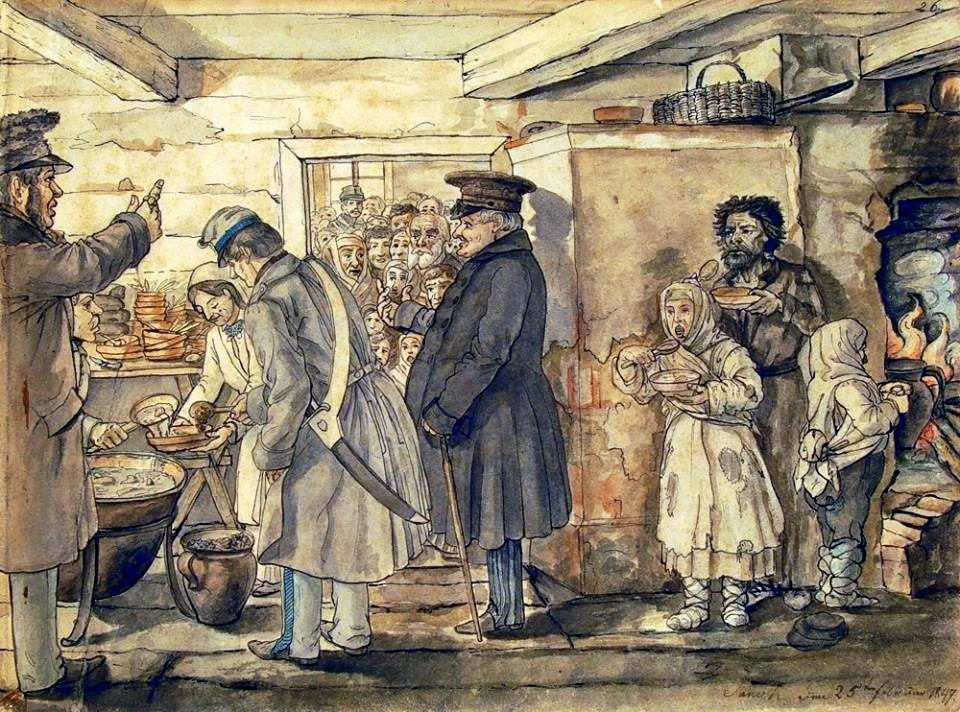
Food distribution to poor people in Galicia (Sanok)

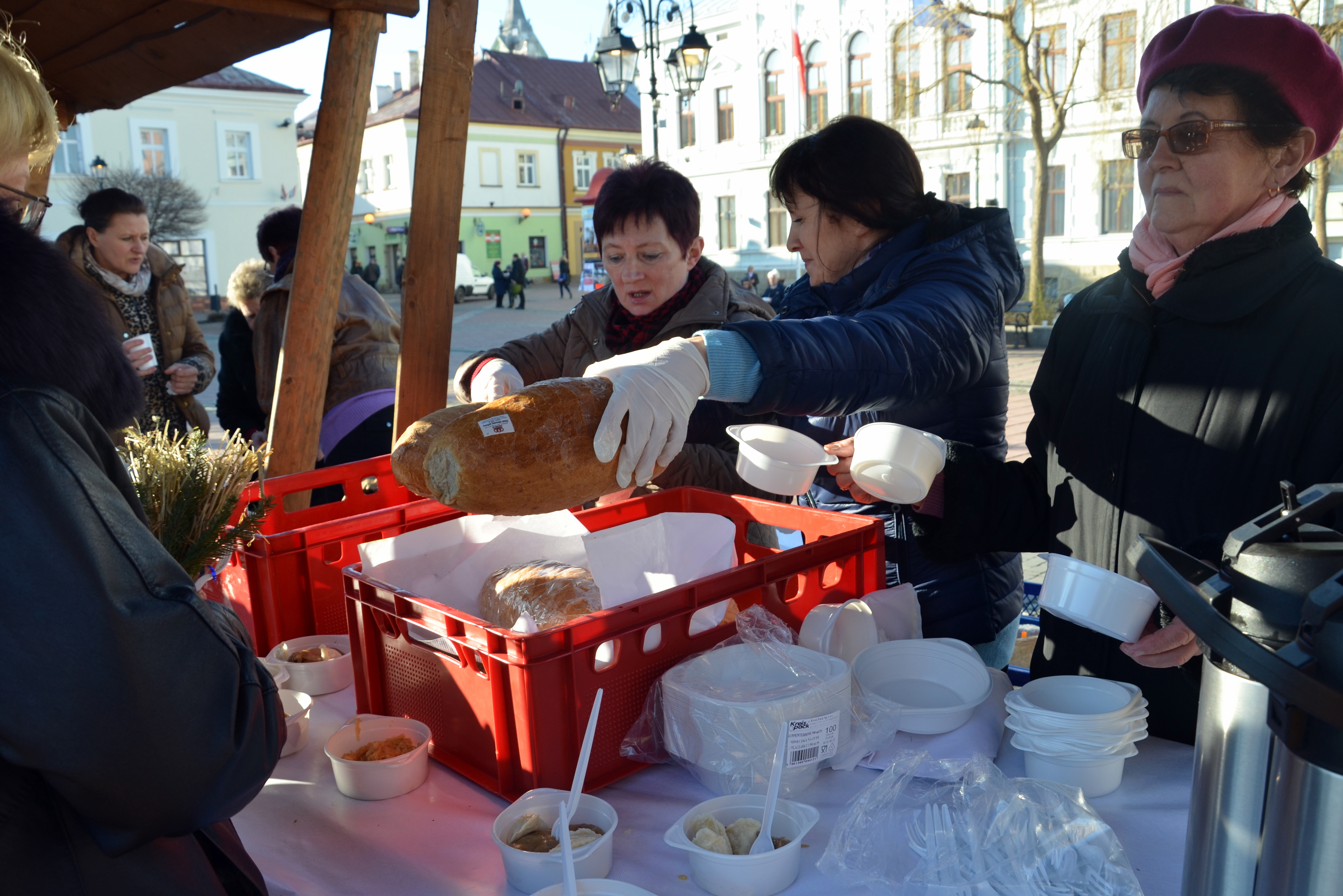
Distribution of loaves to the poor at Christmas Time in Poland (2015)

=== Before WWII ===
During the Second Polish Republic, deep poverty characterized the country's farmers, who made up 70% of the population, a feature that worsened with the Great Depression. Per capita GNP in 1929 was lower than that of the neighboring Baltic states, although, in 1937, higher than in Portugal or Greece. While farm productivity was high in western Poland, it was much lower in southern and eastern areas, due to high population levels and relatively small farm size. In the country's central, southern and eastern regions, 6.5 million people were unable to satisfy their basic food needs by 1934–1935. In 1930–1931, farm laborers earned 54% of their low wages of two years earlier, with one noting his family's diet consisted of unseasoned potatoes, that the unaffordable price of soap meant they were covered in lice, and that a slice of bread was only for special occasions. An observer described the south as "a nightmare of degradation and poverty". By late 1934, rural Poles had an estimated purchasing capacity at 43% of the 1928 level. Urban consumers were aided by falling food prices, but jobs became scarcer, with industrial production in 1932 at 58% of the pre-depression level, and unemployment above 40% in 1932–1934.

Poverty was acute among Polish Jews, who had among the highest rates of natural increase in Europe and were often unable to feed their children. After the Peace treaty of Riga, the already numerous Jewish minority of the Second Polish Republic was joined by several hundred thousand refugees escaping pogroms in the East. More than 75 per cent of them lived in the urban areas, with higher than average number of women, children and the elderly. Poland was struggling with remnants of devastating economic exploitation by the partitioners and their ensuing trade embargos (see also: German–Polish customs war). New job opportunities were mostly nonexistent before Poland's industrialization of the mid-1930s – although Jewish per capita income among the working population was more than 40% higher in 1929 than that of Polish non-Jews. The impoverished families relied on local Jewish charity, which had reached universally unprecedented proportions in 1929, providing services such as religion, education, health and other services to the amount of 200 million zlotys a year.

=== Communist era ===
Under the communist regime state labour policy, income equalizing policies and subsidies to energy, food and housing helped to relieve poverty and made it less visible. Rural workers' incomes were consistently lower than that of their urban counterparts, and poverty affected larger families living in the countryside with high numbers of children; but it also touched town dwellers: unskilled workers, pensioners, single and disabled people, single-parent families, families tied to alcoholism and crime, and young intelligentsia couples just starting independent lives. Family dysfunctions such as serious illness, elderly loneliness, abuse and alcoholism were correlated with poverty, as well as dramatic incidents in people's lives. Those living in poverty tended to have substandard housing, an inability to seek help from institutions, low education levels; they sometimes turned to crime and excessive drinking.

The most common site of poverty was among retirees and those receiving disability payments; one 1979 estimate indicates that 40-50% of pensioners and disabled families lived at or below the social minimum. Next came workers in the lowest income categories (agricultural and unskilled workers, as well as labourers). In 1974, 48% of workers were in low income groups, while in 1979, 10% of people in workers' families were below the social minimum level. A dissenting view is that poverty did not affect employed individuals and their families, as full employment guaranteed subsistence, if at a modest standard. Families with several children came next; in 1974, 60% of children lived in families below the social minimum.

Poverty was sometimes very deep, close to the subsistence minimum; this was the case for single, old and disabled pensioners; other times, it was partial, not affecting people's entire lives. For instance, a lack of adequate accommodation could impact a family's finances. The most common response to money troubles was to take on additional jobs, whether formal or informal, legal or illegal. One innovation was to wait in a queue on behalf of someone else, for a fee. Such practices meant that serious time shortages often came with poverty. As people started doing more at home to save or earn cash (producing food and clothing, repairing, painting apartments), time pressure damaged family life, so that lack of leisure time was a very widespread phenomenon among poor families.

Concurrently, the state tended to neglect the problem: a 1983 work claims that social assistance fulfilled 14% of poor people's needs. Institutions were not proactively interested in bettering people's lives, while the poor had little awareness of their rights. Official ideology saw poverty as a marginal phenomenon caused by unusual life events and pathology, rather than being a usual part of life. In the 1980s, as economic depression and the shortage economy took hold, poverty changed from afflicting the marginalized and the maladapted, to include those willing and able to work.

There are various estimates of poverty's extent in Communist Poland. Using the social minimum level as a measure, the following figures are cited: 20% at the end of the 1960s; 28%, mostly employees, in 1975 (a secret official estimate); about 30% at the end of the 1980s; 14.2% in 1981, 27.2% in 1983, 25.3% in 1987 and 16.3% in 1989, according to the World Bank. One researcher found that the number of the poor increased from 3.3 million in 1978 to 8.6 million in 1987. By a stricter definition of poverty, figures for the end of the 1980s include 5-7%, 6% and 5-10%.

Polish sociologists began analysing poverty almost as soon as sociology was established there. Early research institutions, such as the Institute of Social Economy in the Warsaw School of Economics, analysed poverty, unemployment and the interwar economic migrations. Aside from census data and family budget inquiries, poverty was documented by independent investigations and autobiographical materials. The advent of communism interrupted this research tradition; poverty became a political issue, a social, political and ideological taboo. It was dismissed as a remnant of the previous regime or a byproduct of transitional difficulties; poverty and the poor were labeled with euphemisms such as "sphere of deficiency" or "low-income groups". Book or report titles prior to 1989 never used the term "poverty", while the neglect it received can also be seen in the lack of policies or related legislation. Scientific investigations were limited, with the most important research taking place in periods of relative openness: the time after the Polish October, the early 1970s, and 1980–81. A number of important studies were published in spite of the prevailing ideology, but their publication was either seriously restricted or banned.

=== Early post-communist era ===
It has been estimated that Poland began its transformation from communist to capitalist economy with about 20% of its population in poverty. Poverty in Poland rose briefly in the period of 1990-1992 and has been largely diminishing since; it did however rise again in the late 1990s, following the slowdown in economic growth. In the years 1994–2001, the subjective poverty line remained relatively stable at about 33%; and the relative poverty line (poverty threshold) rose from 13.5% to 17%. Absolute poverty - as defined by the World Bank, the percentage of population living on less than $4.30 per day - in the period 1997-1999 affected 8.4% of Polish population. Estimates by other sources vary, however. According to Brzeziński (2011), in the years 1998-2003 absolute poverty in Poland has risen by about 8%, reaching (according to the Central Statistical Office (GUS) estimate) 18.1% in 2005, and dropping to 10.6% in 2008; an alternate measure suggests that in the period 2005-2008 absolute poverty fell from 12.3% to 5.6%. Brzeziński (2011) notes that any rise in poverty in the period 1998-2005 was outdone by the drop in poverty in the years 2005–2008.

The poverty headcount ratio as a function of the poverty line. The graphs show that regardless of the absolute poverty threshold chosen, poverty in Poland increased from 1992 to 1998, stayed constant until 2006 and then dropped from 2006 to 2009.

According to the Polish Central Statistical Office (GUS) 2011 report, the poverty line in Poland has been decreasing in the last few years, down to about 6.5% in 2011. The report notes, however, that this is mostly due to the fact that the nominal value of the poverty line in Poland has not changed since 2006, thus ignoring inflation. If the poverty line were indexed to inflation, the report estimated that 11.4% of Polish households would be below it. The poverty threshold was estimated at 16.7%. Percent of population receiving less than the living wage was estimated at 6.7%. Poverty has decreased as compared to a 2005 report, which had reported both poverty line and poverty threshold at 18.1%, and the percentage of population receiving less than the living wage at 12.3%. In 2003, about 23% of households believed they lived below the poverty line (declaring that they saw their income as insufficient for basic needs).

Overall, the levels of poverty in Poland have been reported as stable or on the decrease in the past years, but it is still a significant concern. The reduction in poverty slowed down or was partially reversed again in early 2010s, although as of early 2013 the datasets are still mostly preliminary and usually cover the period only up to 2011.

=== Modern era since government shift in 2015 ===
The Law and Justice party won the 2015 parliamentary election, first ever time with an outright majority—something no Polish party had done since the fall of communism, and with the emphasis on lowering income inequality in Poland. The party was founded in 2001 as a centrist and Christian democratic party. Initially the party was broadly pro-market. It has adopted the social market economy rhetoric similar to that of western European Christian democratic parties. However, one of the major themes in the PiS party is balanced social structure and fighting the income inequality. Shortly after assuming power it is launched successful 500+ programme giving monthly monetary benefit of 500zł per child to all families with two or more children. While this is not a social welfare program since it has no conditions like income level nor "any other strings attached", it has most benefited low income families for whom this monetary transfer is significant boost to their disposable income and as such represents transfer of wealth between social groups in the society.

The 500+ program enjoys broad support in the society and in 2019 PiS has both extended the eligibility and added more programs aimed at lowering poverty. This has attracted significant criticism especially from the main opposition liberal party Platforma Obywatelska, and some international media, as the way to buy votes and as populist, anti-liberal agenda. PiS supports state provided universal health care, which is free to all citizens, however it is supplemented by growing private medical care with lower queues.

== Structural breakdown ==
Poverty in Poland has been described as "shallow", referring to the fact that few poor live significantly below the poverty line (as defined by World Bank); the at risk of poverty gap in Poland is estimated at 21%.

In terms of geography, poverty was more likely to affect households in small towns and rural areas, as well as households in the east and north, with the highest poverty reported in Warmia-Mazury Voivodeship, Podlaskie Voivodeship, Lubelskie Voivodeship and Świętokrzyskie Voivodeship (see also: Poland A and B).

Poverty was most prevalent for households suffering from unemployment, disability, and with multiple children. The young are more likely to be affected by the poverty than the old, who are relatively well off due to generous pension system. As such, poverty in Poland is relatively similar, in terms of structure, to that found in most other European countries. Beblo et al. (2002) note that poverty in Poland is primarily caused by unemployment, insufficient aid to families with multiple children or from marginalized groups, and poor earnings in agricultural sector. Brzeziński (2011) notes that the rise in poverty in late 1990s and early 2000s can be attributed to stagnant wages and pensions, and growing unemployment, and its subsequent decline, to economic growth and welfare policies. As of July 2026, according to Eurostat, the unemployment rate in Poland is 3.1%, up from 2.6% in February 2023.

=== Poverty in Poland – international ranking ===
According to Statistics Poland, the proportion of the population living below the national extreme poverty (minimum subsistence) threshold was 4.2% as of 2019. This is approximately 22% or 1.2 percentage points lower than the previous year. In the fourth quarter of 2019, for single-person households, this threshold was set at 614 zł per month (~20.17 zł per day, equivalent to ~€4.71 or ~$5.21 per day at the time).

As of 2017, the proportion of population living under the international poverty line ($1.90 or $3.20 a day adjusting for purchasing power parity) was 0.02% for the $1.90 threshold and 0.03% for the $3.20 threshold.

== Income inequality ==
Income and consumption inequality in Poland, 1985–2009, as measured by the Gini Index.

Since fall of communism in Poland in 1990, income inequality has substantially increased. This has been caused by rising prosperity and to a lesser extent, impoverishment. Rutkowski (1998) notes that "those who have gained from income changes are outnumbered by those who have lost. However, while the gains have been significant, the losses have been relatively small." Those who have gained the most were well-educated, highly skilled white-collar workers and entrepreneurs. Overall, families are more dependent on state assistance than before the transition, with family allowance and unemployment benefits being most important in reducing inequality.

There is a widespread perception of widening wealth gap in Poland, although Rutkowski (1998) argues that it has more to do with social structure changes than actual gap in income distribution.

=== Income inequality in Poland – international ranking ===
Key:
R/P 10%: The ratio of the average income of the richest 10% to the poorest 10%
R/P 20%: The ratio of average income of the richest 20% to the poorest 20%
Gini: Gini index, a quantified representation of a nation's Lorenz curve

UN: Data from the United Nations Development Programme.
CIA: Data from the Central Intelligence Agency's The World Factbook.
GPI: Data from the Global Peace Index.

| Country | UN R/P 10% | UN R/P 20% | World Bank Gini (%) | WB Gini (year) | CIA R/P 10% | Year | CIA Gini (%) | CIA Gini (year) | GPI Gini (%) |
|---|---|---|---|---|---|---|---|---|---|
| Poland | 8.8 | 5.6 | 34.1 | 2009 | 8.7 | 2002 | 34.2 | 2008 | |

== See also ==
- Welfare in Poland
