= Social security system in Poland =

Welfare system by the Polish government

The social security system in Poland includes the following components:

- Social insurance and welfare system
- Health insurance system (see pl:Ubezpieczenie zdrowotne and Health care in Poland)
- Unemployment benefits
- Family benefits

The main institutions responsible for social security are:

- Social Insurance Institution (Zakład Ubezpieczeń Społecznych, ZUS)
- Agricultural Social Insurance Fund (Kasa Rolniczego Ubezpieczenia Społecznego, KRUS)
- Ministry of Family, Labour and Social Policy (Ministerstwo Rodziny, Pracy i Polityki Społecznej, MRPiPS)
- National Health Fund (Narodowy Fundusz Zdrowia, NFZ)
- Open health funds (otwarte fundusze emerytalne, OFE)
- Occupational pension programs (pracownicze programy emerytalne, PPE)
