= Joseph A. Pechman =

Economist and taxation scholar

- Born: April 2, 1918; Brooklyn, New York
- Died: August 19, 1989 (aged 71); Bethesda, Maryland

Academic background
- Education: University of Wisconsin–Madison; City College of New York
- Doctoral advisor: Harold Groves

Academic work
- Discipline: Public finance Taxation

Joseph Aaron Pechman (April 2, 1918 – August 19, 1989) was an influential economist and taxation scholar in the United States. He graduated from the City College of New York and the University of Wisconsin–Madison. He served as president of the American Economic Association and was a fellow of the American Academy of Arts and Sciences. He was also a senior fellow at the Brookings Institution.

== Core Ideas ==
Pechman advocated income taxation, progressive tax rates, and tax reform. He was a major figure in the Tax Reform Act of 1986.

== Scholarship ==
A prolific author, Pechman published influential books such as "Gender in the Workplace" and "How Taxes Affect Economic Behavior".

- Joseph A. Pechman (June 29, 2001). Federal Tax Policy. Brookings Institution Press. ISBN 9780815769613.

== Personal life ==
Pechman was born in Borowie, Poland, in 1918. Pechman was married and had two daughters, Ellen Pechman and Jane Pechman Stern.
