= Northern Hemisphere =

Half of Earth that is north of the Equator

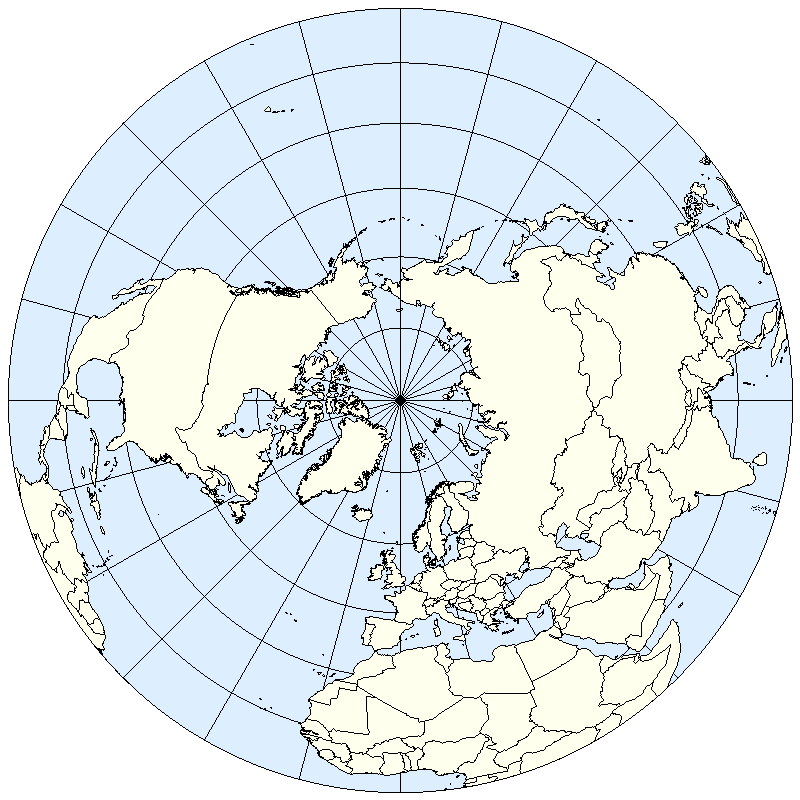
The Northern Hemisphere from above the North Pole

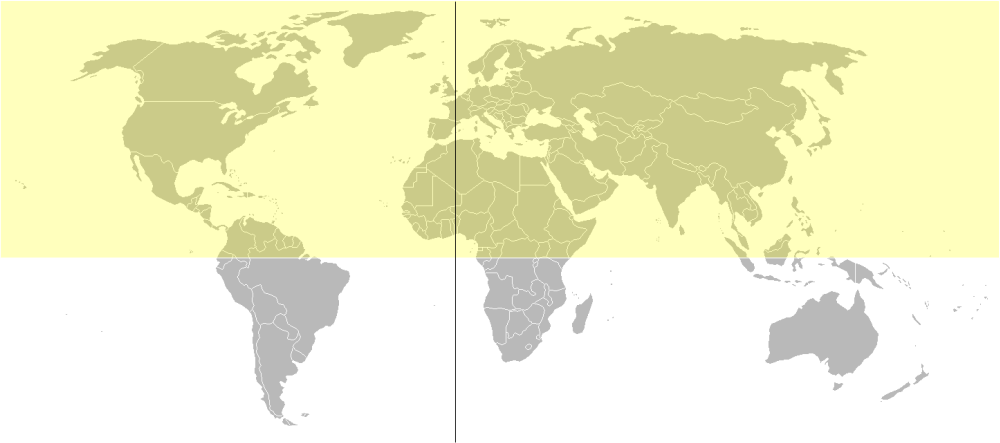
The Northern Hemisphere is highlighted in yellow. The hemispheres appear to be unequal in this image because Antarctica isn’t shown.

The Northern Hemisphere is the half of Earth that is north of the equator. For other planets in the Solar System, north is defined as being in the same celestial hemisphere relative to the invariable plane of the Solar System as Earth's North Pole.

The Northern Hemisphere fully covers the continents of North America and Europe, but the hemisphere also covers the continents of South America, Africa, and Asia, with a percentage of under 100% covering it. Also, North America and Europe are fully in the Northern Hemisphere, while South America, Africa, and Asia are both in the Northern Hemisphere and the Southern Hemisphere.

Due to Earth's axial tilt of 23.439281°, there is a seasonal variation in the lengths of the day and night. There is also a seasonal variation in temperatures, which lags the variation in day and night. Conventionally, winter in the Northern Hemisphere is taken as the period from the December solstice (typically December 21 UTC) to the March equinox (typically March 20 UTC), while summer is taken as the period from the June solstice through to the September equinox (typically on 23 September UTC). The dates vary each year due to the difference between the calendar year and the astronomical year. Within the Northern Hemisphere, oceanic currents can change the weather patterns that affect many factors within the north coast. Such events include El Niño–Southern Oscillation.

Trade winds blow from east to west just above the equator. The winds pull surface water with them, creating currents, which flow westward due to the Coriolis effect. The currents then bend to the right, heading north. At about 30 degrees north latitude, a different set of winds, the westerlies, push the currents back to the east, producing a closed clockwise loop.

Its surface is 60.7% water, compared with 80.9% water in the case of the Southern Hemisphere, and it contains 67.3% of Earth's land. The continents of North America and mainland Eurasia are located entirely in the Northern Hemisphere, together with about two-thirds of Africa and a small part of South America.

== Geography and climate ==
During the 2.5 million years of the Pleistocene, numerous cold phases, called glacials (Quaternary ice age), or significant advances of continental ice sheets, in Europe and North America, occurred at intervals of approximately 40,000 to 100,000 years. The long glacial periods were separated by more temperate and shorter interglacials which lasted about 10,000–15,000 years. The last cold episode of the last glacial period ended about 10,000 years ago. Earth is currently in an interglacial period of the Quaternary, called the Holocene. The glaciations that occurred during the glacial period covered many areas of the Northern Hemisphere.

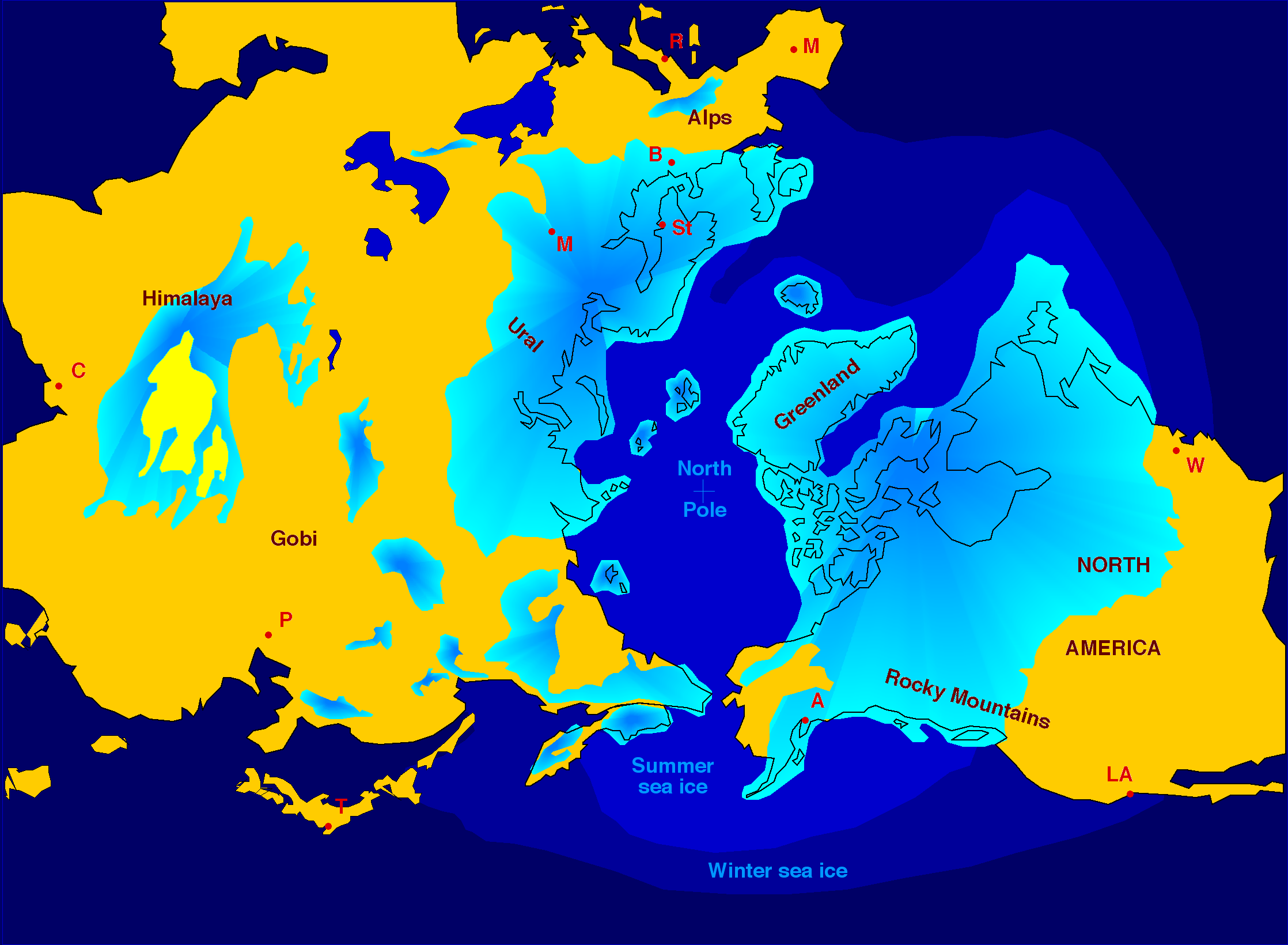
Northern Hemisphere glaciation during the last ice ages. The setup of 3 to 4-kilometer thick ice sheets caused a sea level lowering of about 120 m.

The Arctic is a region around the North Pole (90° latitude). Its climate is characterized by cold winters and cool summers. Precipitation mostly comes in the form of snow. Areas inside the Arctic Circle (66°34′ latitude) experience some days in summer when the Sun never sets, and some days during the winter when it never rises. The duration of these phases varies from one day for locations right on the Arctic Circle to several months near the Pole, which is the middle of the Northern Hemisphere. Between the Arctic Circle and the Tropic of Cancer (23°26′ latitude) lies the Northern temperate zone. The changes in these regions between summer and winter are generally mild, rather than extreme hot or cold. However, a temperate climate can have very unpredictable weather.

Tropical regions (between the Tropic of Cancer and the Equator, 0° latitude) are generally hot all year round and tend to experience a rainy season during the summer months, and a dry season during the winter months.

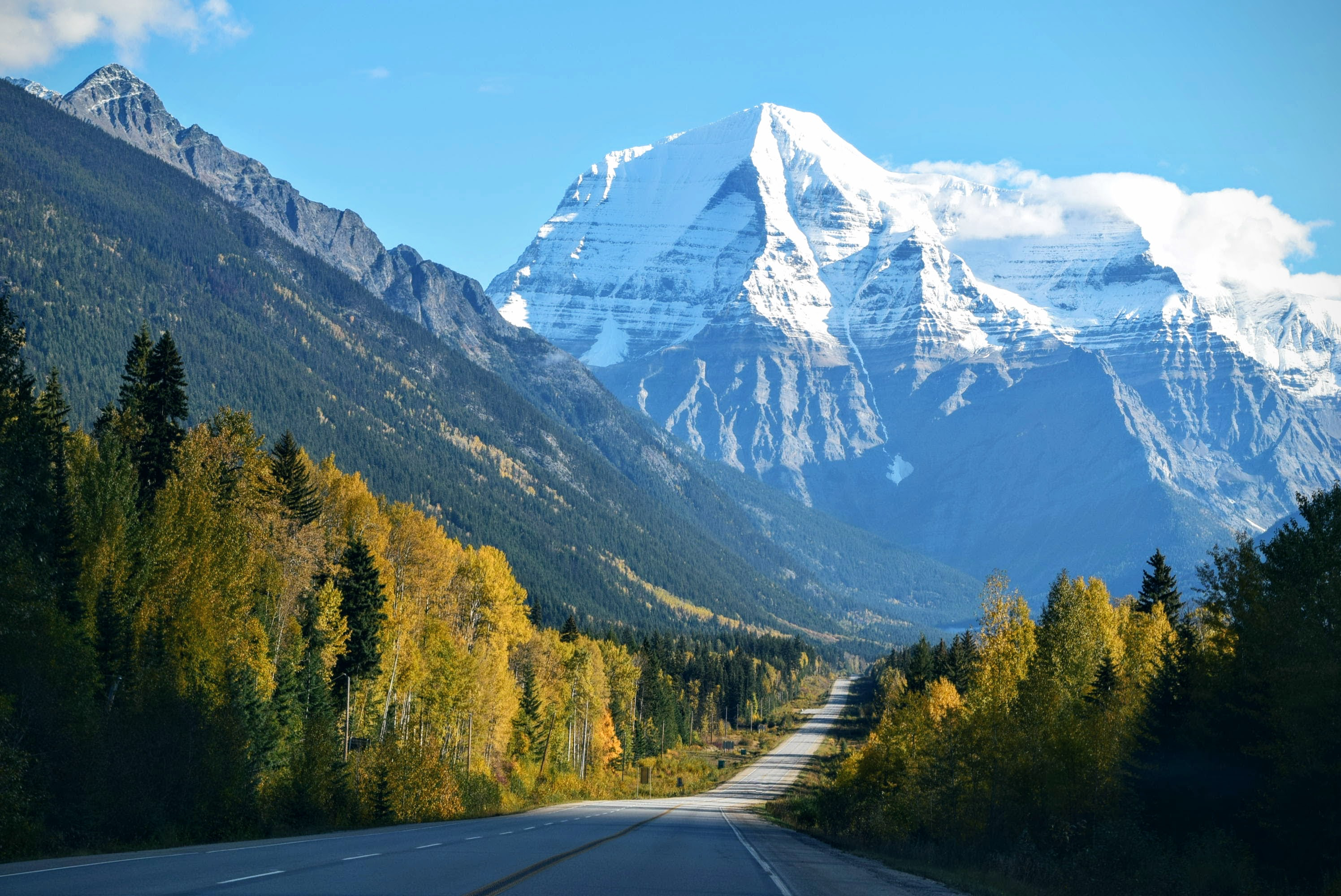
Canadian Rockies in North America

In the Northern Hemisphere, objects moving across or above the surface of the Earth tend to turn to the right because of the Coriolis effect. As a result, large-scale horizontal flows of air or water tend to form clockwise-turning gyres. These are best seen in ocean circulation patterns in the North Atlantic and North Pacific oceans. Within the Northern Hemisphere, oceanic currents can change the weather patterns that affect many factors within the north coast. For the same reason, flows of air down toward the northern surface of the Earth tend to spread across the surface in a clockwise pattern. Thus, clockwise air circulation is characteristic of high pressure weather cells in the Northern Hemisphere. Conversely, air rising from the northern surface of the Earth (creating a region of low pressure) tends to draw air toward it in a counterclockwise pattern. Hurricanes and tropical storms (massive low-pressure systems) spin counterclockwise in the Northern Hemisphere.

The shadow of a sundial moves clockwise on latitudes north of the subsolar point and anticlockwise to the south. During the day at these latitudes, the Sun tends to rise to its maximum at a southerly position. Between the Tropic of Cancer and the Equator, the Sun can be seen to the north, directly overhead, or to the south at noon, depending on the time of year. In the Southern Hemisphere, the midday Sun is predominantly in the north.

When viewed from the Northern Hemisphere, the Moon appears inverted compared to a view from the Southern Hemisphere. The North Pole faces away from the Galactic Center of the Milky Way. This results in the Milky Way being sparser and dimmer in the Northern Hemisphere compared to the Southern Hemisphere, making the Northern Hemisphere more suitable for deep-space observation, as it is not "blinded" by the Milky Way.

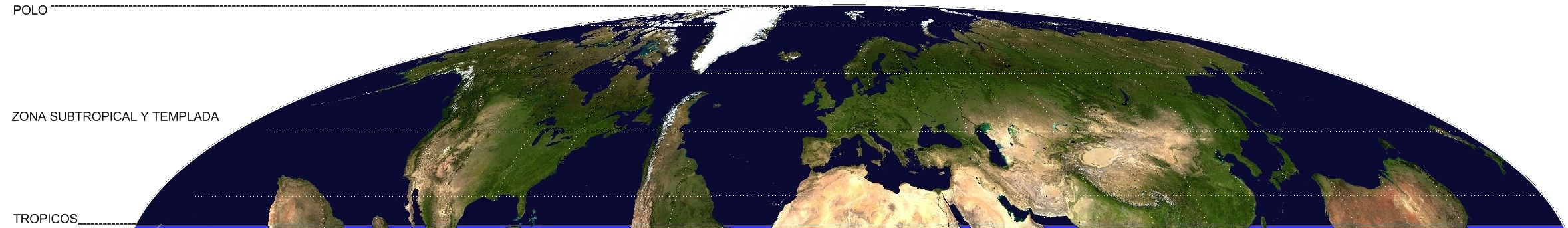
A map showing territories in the Southern and Northern Hemispheres (excluding Antarctica and tropical zones) positioned within the same hemisphere, allowing for a comparison of latitudes. For example, it can be seen that the Ireland Island and the Tierra del Fuego Island lie at the same latitude in their respective hemispheres, as do the cities of Belfast and Ushuaia.

== Demographics ==
As of 2015, approximately 6.4 billion people live somewhere in the northern hemisphere, which is around 87.0% of the Earth's total human population of 7.3 billion people.

== List of continents, countries or territories, and oceans in the Northern Hemisphere ==
Continents
Africa	Asia	Americas	Europe
About two-thirds, from north of Libreville in Gabon in the west to south of Mogadishu in Somalia in the east.	The entire continental mainland. Part of Indonesia, and 24 out of 26 atolls of Maldives in the Indian Ocean, are also in the Northern Hemisphere.	All of North America, Central America, and the Caribbean islands. About one-fifth of South America, from north of Quito in Ecuador in the west to north of the Amazon River mouth in Brazil in the east.	Entirely in the Northern Hemisphere (Note: The continent itself is entirely within the Northern Hemisphere. However, some overseas territories of the countries of France, Norway and the United Kingdom are in the Southern Hemisphere.)
Countries or Territories
Africa	Asia	Americas	Europe
Entirely: Algeria; Benin; Burkina Faso; Cameroon; Cape Verde; Central African Republic; Chad; Djibouti; Egypt; Eritrea; Ethiopia; Gambia; Ghana; Guinea; Guinea-Bissau; Ivory Coast; Liberia; Libya; Mali; Mauritania; Morocco; Niger; Nigeria; Senegal; Sierra Leone; South Sudan; Sudan; Togo; Tunisia; Mostly: Equatorial Guinea; Kenya; São Tomé and Príncipe; Somalia; Uganda; Partly: Democratic Republic of the Congo; Gabon; Republic of the Congo	Entirely: Afghanistan; Armenia; Azerbaijan; Bahrain; Bangladesh; Bhutan; Brunei; Cambodia; China; Cyprus; Georgia; India; Iran; Iraq; Israel; Japan; Jordan; Kazakhstan; Kuwait; Kyrgyzstan; Laos; Lebanon; Malaysia; Mongolia; Myanmar; Nepal; North Korea; Oman; Pakistan; Palestine; Philippines; Qatar; Saudi Arabia; Singapore; South Korea; Sri Lanka; Syria; Taiwan; Tajikistan; Thailand; Turkey; Turkmenistan; United Arab Emirates; Uzbekistan; Vietnam; Yemen; Mostly: Maldives; Partly: Indonesia	Entirely: Belize; Canada; Costa Rica; El Salvador; French Guiana; Guatemala; Guyana; Honduras; Mexico; Nicaragua; Panama; Suriname; Venezuela; United States; Mostly: Colombia; Partly: Brazil; Ecuador	Entirely: Albania; Andorra; Austria; Belarus; Belgium; Bosnia and Herzegovina; Bulgaria; Croatia; Czech Republic; Denmark; Estonia; Finland; Germany; Greece; Hungary; Iceland; Ireland; Italy; Latvia; Liechtenstein; Lithuania; Luxembourg; Malta; Moldova; Monaco; Montenegro; Netherlands; North Macedonia; Poland; Portugal; Romania; Russia; San Marino; Serbia; Slovakia; Slovenia; Spain; Sweden; Switzerland; Ukraine; Vatican City; Mostly: France; Norway; United Kingdom
Oceans
Arctic	Atlantic	Indian	Pacific
Entirely: Jan Mayen, Norway; Kaffeklubben Island, Denmark; Queen Elizabeth Islands, Canada; Russian Arctic islands, Russia; Svalbard (Norway)	Entirely: Akrotiri and Dhekelia, British Overseas Territories; Anguilla, British Overseas Territories; Antigua and Barbuda; Aruba, Kingdom of the Netherlands; Bahamas; Guernsey, a Crown Dependency; Jersey, a Crown Dependency; Barbados; Bermuda, British Overseas Territories; Bioko (Equatorial Guinea); Bonaire, Kingdom of the Netherlands; British Virgin Islands, British Overseas Territories; Cape Verde; Cayman Islands, British Overseas Territories; Cuba; Curaçao, Kingdom of the Netherlands; Cyprus; Dominica; Dominican Republic; Faroe Islands, Kingdom of Denmark; Greenland, Kingdom of Denmark; Grenada; Guadeloupe, Overseas Collectivity of France; Haiti; Iceland; Isle of Man, a Crown Dependency; Jamaica; Martinique, Overseas Collectivity of France; Montserrat, British Overseas Territories; Puerto Rico, Territories of the United States; Saba, Kingdom of the Netherlands; Saint Kitts and Nevis; Saint Lucia; Saint Martin, Overseas Collectivity of France; Saint Vincent and the Grenadines; Sint Eustatius, Kingdom of the Netherlands; Sint Maarten, Kingdom of the Netherlands; Trinidad and Tobago; Turks and Caicos Islands, British Overseas Territories; U.S. Virgin Islands, Territories of the United States; Mostly: São Tomé and Príncipe	Entirely: Bahrain; Andaman Islands (India); Sri Lanka; Socotra (Yemen); Singapore; Mostly: Sumatra (Indonesia); Maldives	Entirely: Guam, Territories of the United States; Hainan (China); Hawaii, (U.S. State); Japan; Northern Mariana Islands, Territories of the United States; Palau; Philippines; Formosa (Taiwan); Mostly: Borneo, (Brunei, and Malaysia) or Kalimantan in Indonesia; Maluku Islands (Indonesia); Partly: Kiribati; Sulawesi (Indonesia); Western New Guinea (Indonesia)

== See also ==
- Southern Hemisphere
- Hemispheres of Earth
- Africa
- Asia
- Americas
- Europe
- Arctic Ocean
- Atlantic Ocean
- Indian Ocean
- Pacific Ocean
- North–South divide (disambiguation)
- Global North
