= Chromin =

- Village
- Location within Poland
- Coordinates: 51°58′N 21°49′E
- Country: Poland
- Voivodeship: Masovian
- County: Garwolin
- Gmina: Borowie

Chromin [ˈxrɔmin] is a village in the administrative district of Gmina Borowie, within Garwolin County, Masovian Voivodeship, in east-central Poland.
