= Gmina Borowie =

Gmina Borowie Borowie Commune
- Gmina
- Coat of arms
- Interactive map of Gmina Borowie
- Coordinates (Borowie): 51°56′54″N 21°45′56″E
- Country: Poland
- Voivodeship: Masovian
- County: Garwolin
- Seat: Borowie

Area
  - Total: 80.41 km^{2} (31.05 sq mi)

Population (2006)
  - Total: 5,131
  - Density: 63.81/km^{2} (165.3/sq mi)
- Website: http://www.borowie.pl/

Gmina Borowie is a rural gmina (administrative district) in Garwolin County, Masovian Voivodeship, in east-central Poland. Its seat is the village of Borowie, which lies approximately 11 kilometres (7 mi) north-east of Garwolin and 61 km (38 mi) south-east of Warsaw.

The gmina covers an area of 80.41 square kilometres (31.0 sq mi), and as of 2006 its total population is 5,131.

== Villages ==
Gmina Borowie contains the villages and settlements of Borowie, Brzuskowola, Chromin, Dudka, Filipówka, Głosków, Gościewicz, Gózd, Iwowe, Jaźwiny, Kamionka, Laliny, Łętów, Łopacianka, Nowa Brzuza, Słup Drugi, Słup Pierwszy, Stara Brzuza and Wilchta.

== Neighbouring gminas ==
Gmina Borowie is bordered by the gminas of Garwolin, Górzno, Latowicz, Miastków Kościelny, Parysów, Stoczek Łukowski and Wodynie.
