= Gózd, Garwolin County =

Gózd
- Village
- Location within Poland
- Coordinates: 51°58′21″N 21°44′58″E
- Country: Poland
- Voivodeship: Masovian
- County: Garwolin
- Gmina: Borowie

Gózd [ɡust] is a village in the administrative district of Gmina Borowie, within Garwolin County, Masovian Voivodeship, in east-central Poland.
