= Jaźwiny, Gmina Borowie =

Jaźwiny
- Village
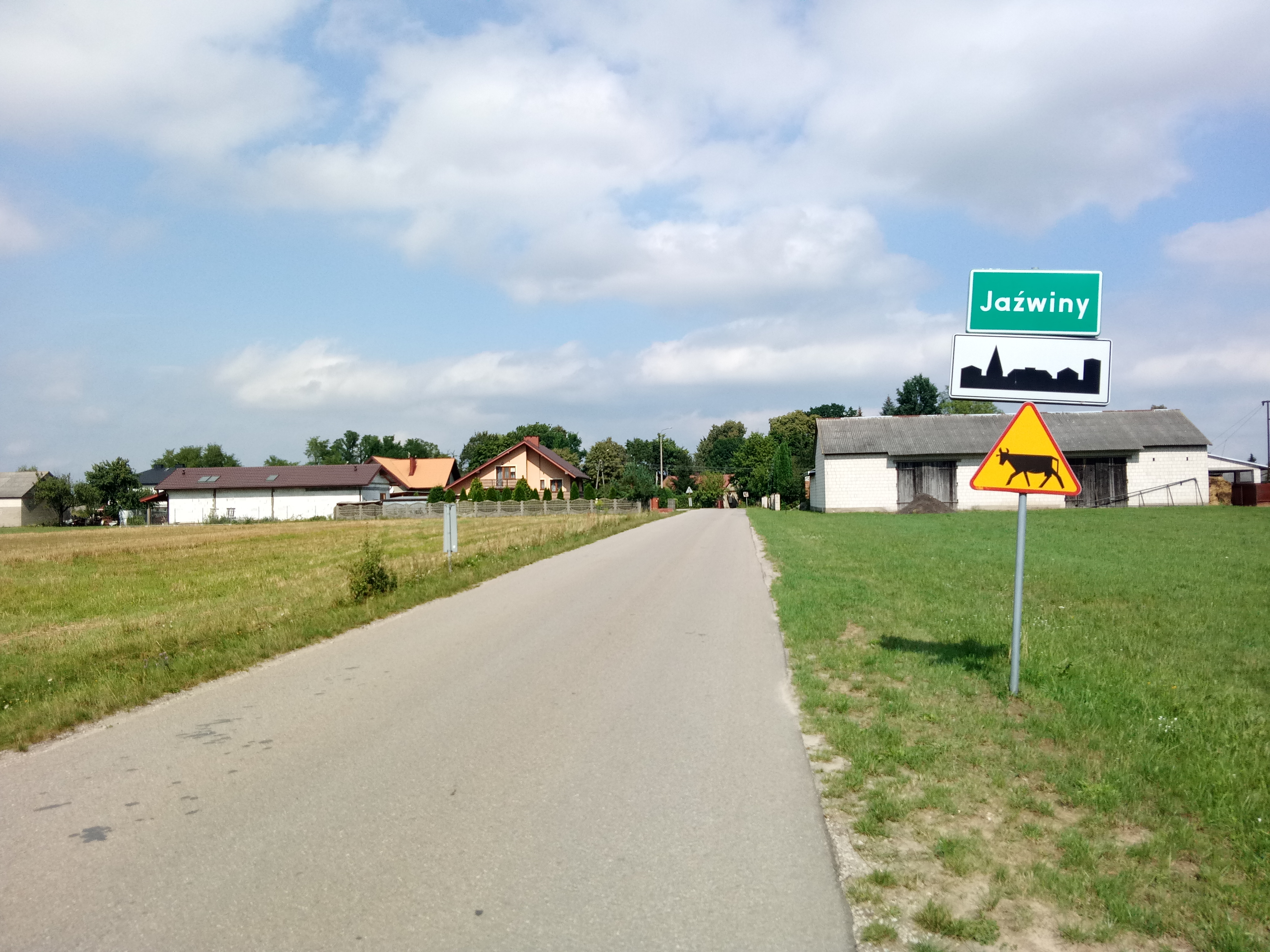

- Location within Poland
- Coordinates: 51°57′39″N 21°45′47″E
- Country: Poland
- Voivodeship: Masovian
- County: Garwolin
- Gmina: Borowie

Jaźwiny [jaʑˈvinɨ] is a village in the administrative district of Gmina Borowie, within Garwolin County, Masovian Voivodeship, in east-central Poland.
