= Nowa Brzuza =

- Village
- Location within Poland
- Coordinates: 51°56′41″N 21°46′50″E
- Country: Poland
- Voivodeship: Masovian
- County: Garwolin
- Gmina: Borowie

Nowa Brzuza [ˈnɔva ˈbʐuza] is a village in the administrative district of Gmina Borowie, within Garwolin County, Masovian Voivodeship, in east-central Poland.
