= Słup Pierwszy =

- Village
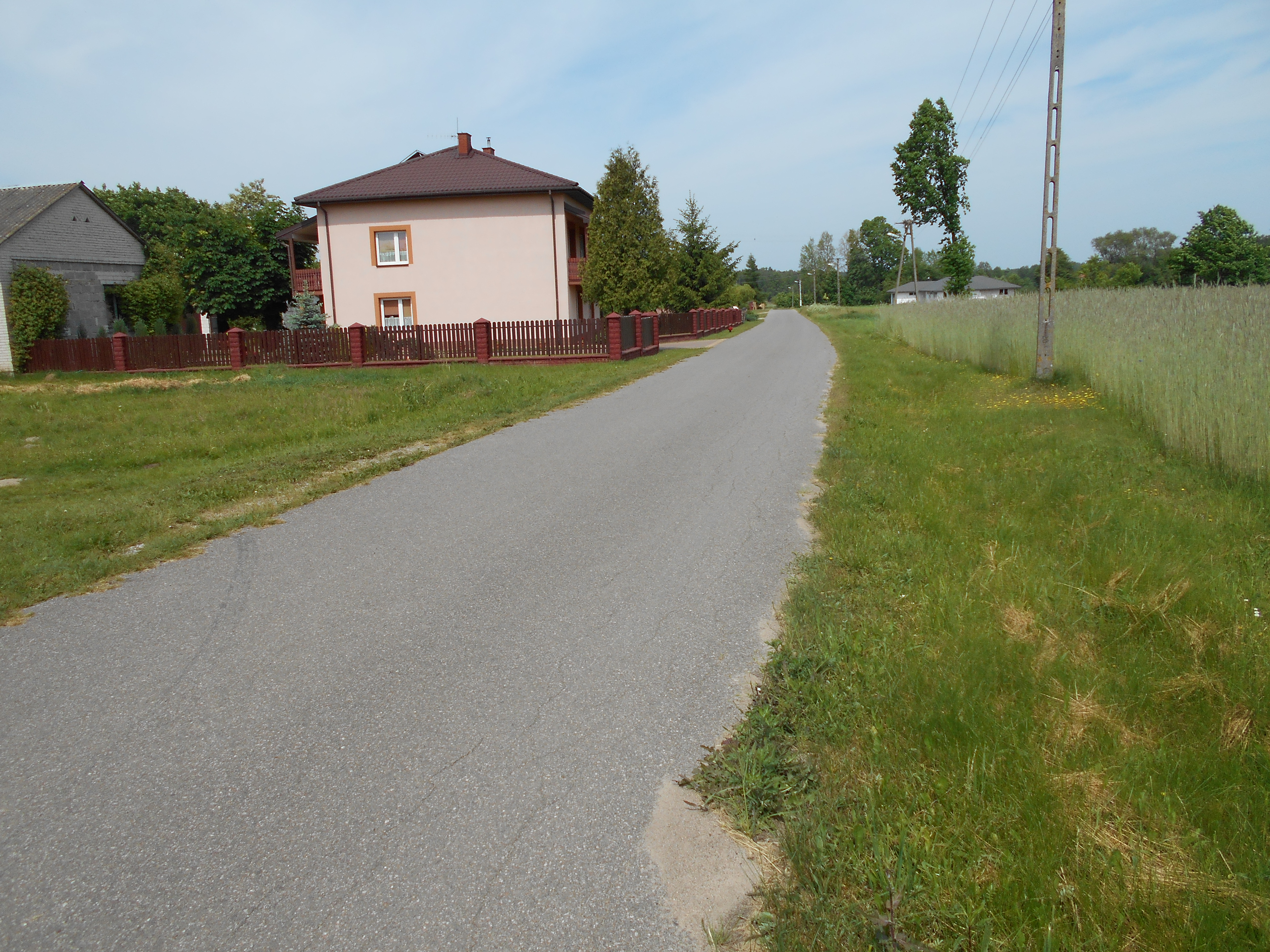

- Location within Poland
- Coordinates: 51°57′01″N 21°43′45″E
- Country: Poland
- Voivodeship: Masovian
- County: Garwolin
- Gmina: Borowie
- Time zone: UTC+1 (CET)
  - Summer (DST): UTC+2 (CEST)

Słup Pierwszy [ˈswup ˈpjɛrfʂɨ] is a village in the administrative district of Gmina Borowie, within Garwolin County, Masovian Voivodeship, in east-central Poland.

Nine Polish citizens were murdered by Nazi Germany in Słup Pierwszy and Słup Drugi during World War II.
