= Stara Brzuza =

- Village
- Location within Poland
- Coordinates: 51°56′35″N 21°47′45″E
- Country: Poland
- Voivodeship: Masovian
- County: Garwolin
- Gmina: Borowie
- Time zone: UTC+1 (CET)
  - Summer (DST): UTC+2 (CEST)

Stara Brzuza [ˈstara ˈbʐuza] is a village in the administrative district of Gmina Borowie, within Garwolin County, Masovian Voivodeship, in east-central Poland.

Six Polish citizens were murdered by Nazi Germany in the village during World War II.
