= Słup Drugi =

- Village
- Location within Poland
- Coordinates: 51°57′24″N 21°43′16″E
- Country: Poland
- Voivodeship: Masovian
- County: Garwolin
- Gmina: Borowie

Population
  - Total: 150
- Time zone: UTC+1 (CET)
  - Summer (DST): UTC+2 (CEST)

Słup Drugi [ˈswup ˈdruɡi] is a village in the administrative district of Gmina Borowie, within Garwolin County, Masovian Voivodeship, in east-central Poland.

Nine Polish citizens were murdered by Nazi Germany in Słup Drugi and Słup Pierwszy during World War II.
