= Łopacianka =

- Village
- Location within Poland
- Coordinates: 51°58′N 21°51′E
- Country: Poland
- Voivodeship: Masovian
- County: Garwolin
- Gmina: Borowie

Łopacianka [wɔpaˈt͡ɕaŋka] is a village in the administrative district of Gmina Borowie, within Garwolin County, Masovian Voivodeship, in east-central Poland.
