= Wilchta =

- Village
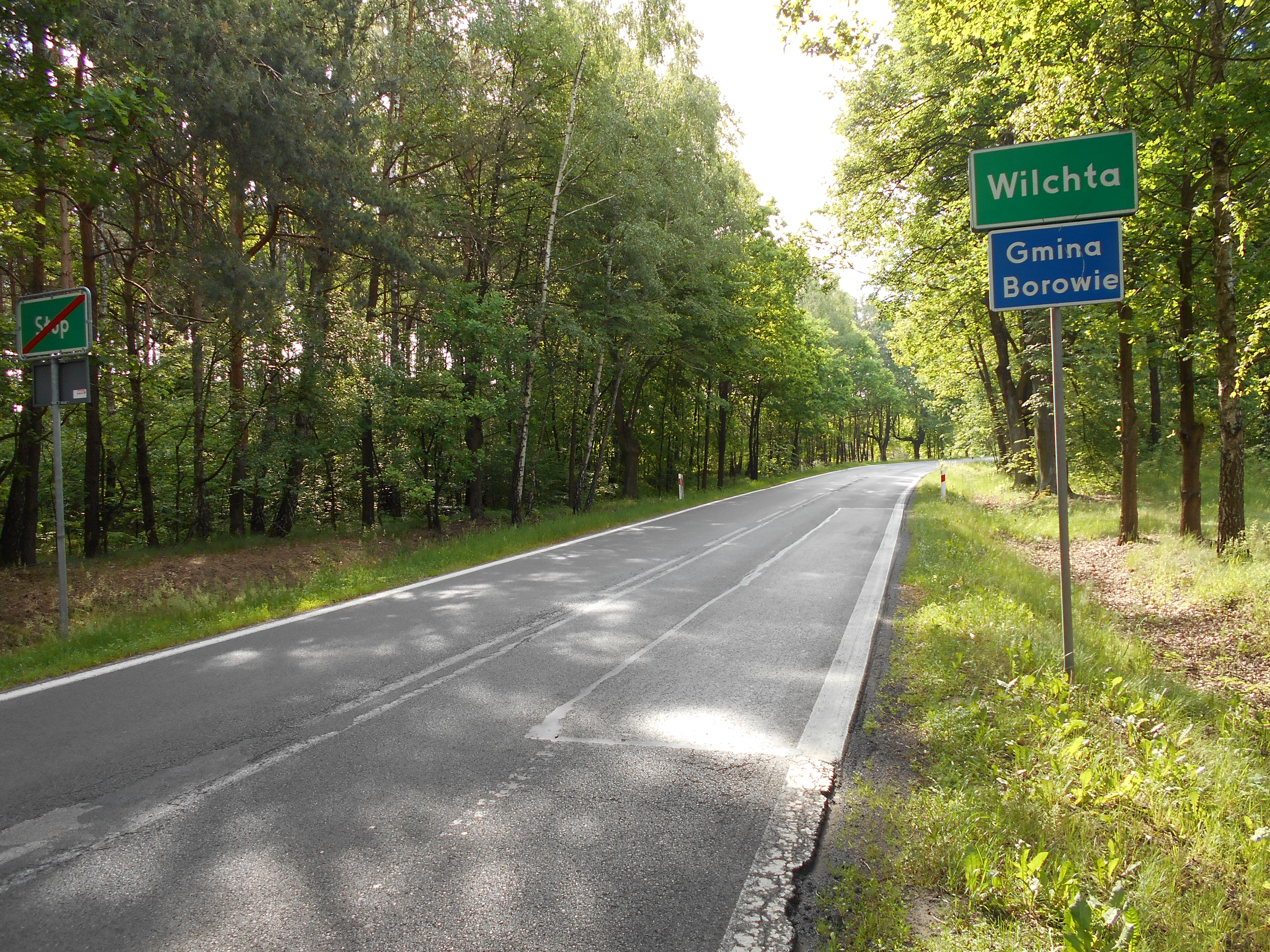

- Location within Poland
- Coordinates: 51°56′39″N 21°42′27″E
- Country: Poland
- Voivodeship: Masovian
- County: Garwolin
- Gmina: Borowie

Wilchta [ˈvilt͡sxta] is a village in the administrative district of Gmina Borowie, within Garwolin County, Masovian Voivodeship, in east-central Poland.
