= Dudka, Masovian Voivodeship =

Dudka
- Village
- Location within Poland
- Coordinates: 51°56′N 21°43′E
- Country: Poland
- Voivodeship: Masovian
- County: Garwolin
- Gmina: Borowie

Dudka [ˈdutka] is a village in the administrative district of Gmina Borowie, within Garwolin County, Masovian Voivodeship, in east-central Poland.
