= Gościewicz =

- Village
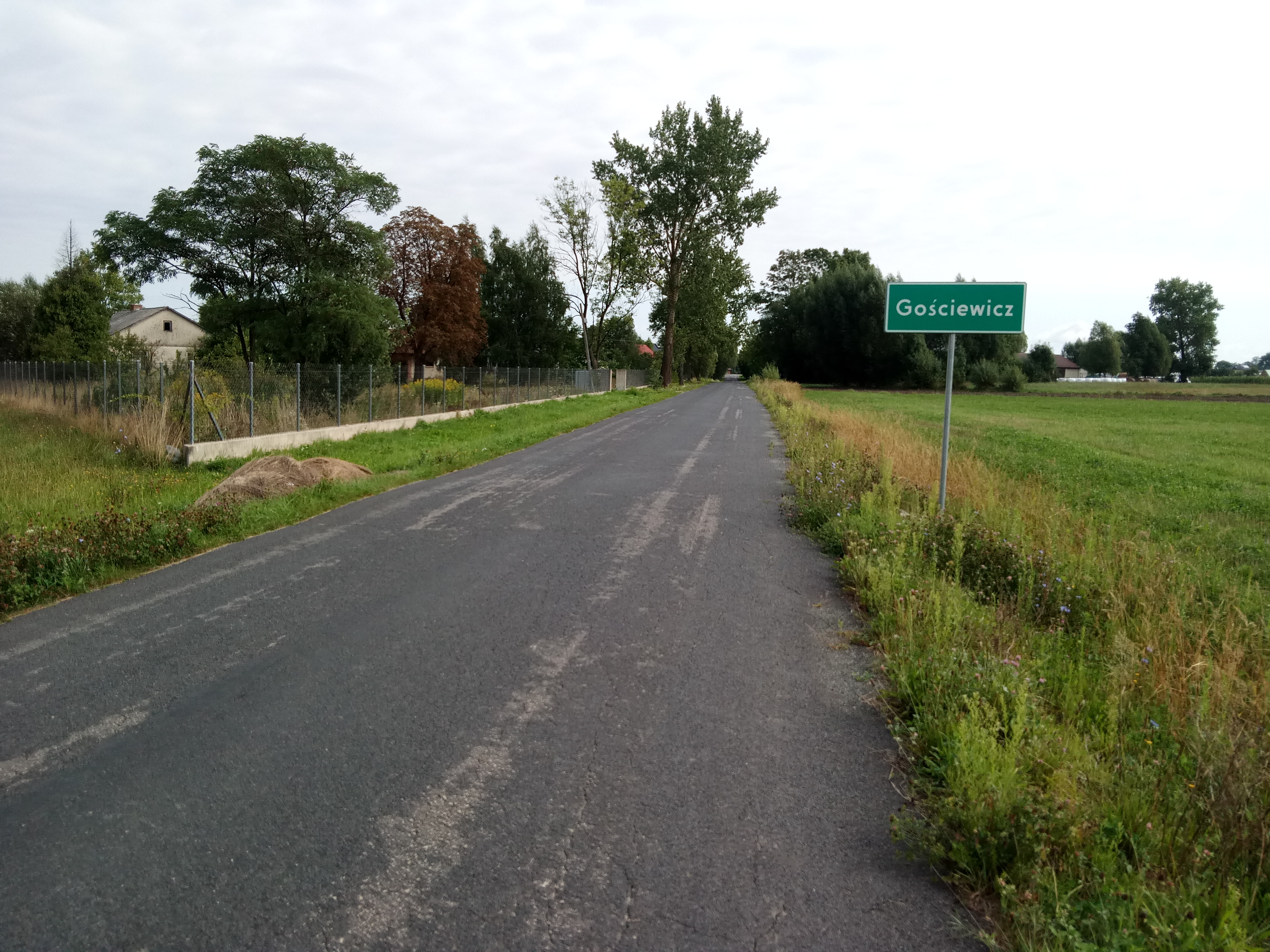

- Location within Poland
- Coordinates: 51°56′N 21°51′E
- Country: Poland
- Voivodeship: Masovian
- County: Garwolin
- Gmina: Borowie

Gościewicz (Polish pronunciation: [ɡɔɕˈt͡ɕɛvit͡ʂ]) is a rural village in the administrative district of Gmina Borowie, within Garwolin County, Masovian Voivodeship, in east-central Poland.
