= East–West divide =

The East-West divide can refer to:

- East–West dichotomy (global divide between Eastern and Western worlds)
- East–West divide in Germany
- East–West divide in Poland
- East–West divide in the Czech Republic

== See also ==
- North–South divide
