= Monar =

Polish charity

Monar is a Polish non-governmental organization focused on helping drug addicts, the homeless, those who are HIV positive or who have AIDS, and many other groups of people who need help. It was established formally as an association in 1981.

The origins of Monar lie in the centre which was opened on 15 October 1978 in Gloskow near Garwolin, by Marek Kotański. He and several other volunteers rebuilt an abandoned house in ruins.

The organisation maintains 30 stationary centres of rehabilitation, and 28 points of "temporary help" for drug and alcohol addicts. It also maintains 70 hostels for homeless people and 13 points of information trying to prevent AIDS, drug addiction, helping parents etc.

The organisation employs around 700 professionals (medical staff, psychologists etc.) and it is supported by around 300 volunteers each year. Around 2,000 drug and alcohol addicts are recovered each year. Around 20,000 homeless people are using Monar hostels.
