= Unemployment in Poland =

Unemployment rates in the European Union (July 2018)

Unemployment in Poland appeared in the 19th century during industrialization, and was particularly severe during the Great Depression. Under communist rule Poland officially had close to full employment, although hidden unemployment existed. After Poland's transition to a market economy the unemployment rate sharply increased, peaking at above 16% in 1993, then dropped afterwards, but remained well above pre-1993 levels. Another period of high unemployment occurred in the early 2000s when the rate reached 20%. As Poland entered the European Union (EU) and its job market in 2004, the high unemployment set off a wave of emigration, and as a result domestic unemployment started a downward trend that continued until the onset of the 2008 Great Recession. Recent years have seen an increase in the unemployment rate from below 8% to above 10% (Eurostat) or from below 10% to 13% (GUS). The rate began dropping again in late 2013. Polish government (GUS) reported 9.6% registered unemployment in November 2015, while European Union's Eurostat gave 7.2%. According to Eurostat data, since 2008, unemployment in Poland has been constantly below the EU average. Significant regional differences in the unemployment rate exist across Poland. As of July 2026, according to Eurostat, the unemployment rate in Poland is 3.1%, up from 2.6% in February 2023.

== Definition and measurement ==
Unemployment rates in Poland and EU28 and EU18 (Eurostat)

Unemployment rates are reported by the Polish Central Statistical Office, and the European Union's Eurostat office. The difference in the reported statistics is due to adjustments that Eurostat makes to make the unemployment rate comparable across countries in Europe.

The unemployment rate as reported by GUS is defined as percent of those without work out of the economically active population. To be counted as unemployed a person has to fulfill four criteria: 1) be between 17 and 74 years of age, 2) be out of work, 3) have actively sought unemployment in the past four weeks, and 4) were ready to take employment within a short period if offered. Additionally, the rate counts as unemployed those who have been hired for a job but have not yet started active work.

Eurostat uses the same harmonized definition of unemployment for all countries in the EU, based on the definition of the International Labour Organization. This definition is similar to the one used by GUS but considers people between 15 and 74, rather than 17 and 74, years of age, and counts the unemployed as a percentage of the labor force.

== History ==
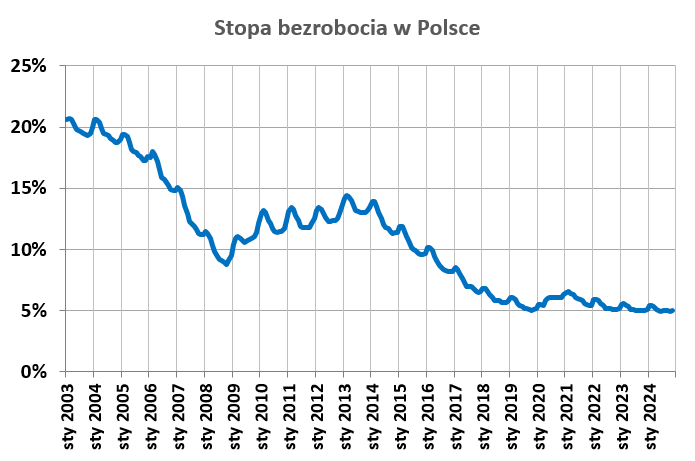
Unemployment rate in Poland from January 2003 to January 2019 (GUS)

Unemployment originated in Poland in the late 19th century, and appeared as a result of industrialization. In Russian-ruled Congress Poland, the 1904 onset of war with Japan caused a depression that deepened with the following year's revolution. Meanwhile, efforts by the government to shift industry to Russia proper led to long-term industrial recession. Massive unemployment of factory workers ensued, in turn prompting both urban and rural Poles to emigrate. In the Second Polish Republic (1918–1939), unemployment was among the worst problems of the economy, particularly during the Great Depression (1929–1934). The number of registered unemployed jumped from 185,000 in 1928 to 466,000 in 1936; in 1932, there were 240,000 unemployed industrial workers, or one-third of the total in that field. Not only industrial workers but also members of the intelligentsia were affected. Official statistics for the period only account for non-farm wage and salary earners who registered as unemployed with a labor exchange. Thus, government data account for just part of the actual number of jobless. One scholar calculated a non-farm wage-earner unemployment rate of 13% for 1929 and 25% for 1931, estimating a "substantially higher" figure for 1938, given natural increase in the urban population and migration from rural areas.

The Polish People's Republic (1945-1989) was officially characterized by nearly full employment, not accounting for unofficial hidden unemployment. Following Poland's transformation from a communist to capitalist economy after the Revolutions of 1989, unemployment sharply increased from the officially reported 0% to 6.5% in 1990, peaking at 16.4% at 1993, and then decreasing to about 10.3% in 1997. The unemployment rate then begun rising again until 2002, reaching a zenith of almost 20% around that time. As Poland entered European Union in 2004 and its job market, mass emigration due to unemployment took place lowering the figure. It has dropped to 8.9% in September 2008, but then started rising again, reaching about 13% in the years 2012–2014. The unemployment raise in the late 2000s and early 2010s has been attributed to the global recession in that period.

As of February 2019, Poland's unemployment rate has been reported as 6,1% (GUS) and 3,4% (European Central Bank, Eurostat), and has been steadily decreasing over the years from the previous high of c. 20% in the early 2000s. Mainly from 2015 onwards, the improved economy and drastic drop in joblessness statewide, causes a serious problem of a labour shortage. The labor force shortage has become a permanent problem in Poland, and it's increasingly weighing on the future performance of the Polish economy. Due to significant worker shortages, in cooperation with a private companies, the Polish government allows for convicted prisoners to be employed. Since 2015, around two million Ukrainians were granted Polish work permits.

== Regional distribution ==
Unemployment rate in major Polish cities and metropolitan areas for 2016

One of the characteristics of Poland's unemployment is difference between regions, with the eastern regions being seen as usually worse affected. However, data do not show a clear correlation with the Poland A and B ("rich west" vs "poor east") division. In May 2019, the highest unemployment rates were reported by the northeast Warmian-Masurian Voivodeship (9.2%), northcentral Kuyavian-Pomeranian Voivodeship (8.1%) and southeast Podkarpackie Voivodeship (8.1%). Lowest unemployment rate was reported by the central-west Greater Poland Voivodeship (2.9%), the southern Silesian Voivodeship (4.0%) and Lesser Poland Voivodeship (4.4%). The 2019 statistics show the lowest recorded statewide, regional unemployment since 1990.

== Unemployment benefits ==
To get unemployment benefits in Poland, one has to register with the appropriate government office and demonstrate "the lack of the possibility to be employed or to be professionally activated within the field of activities proposed by the said office, have worked for a total of at least 365 days in the period of 18 months before registering with the said government office." In March 2014 it was reported that 13.6% of the registered unemployed were eligible for the unemployment benefits.
