= Borowie =

- Village
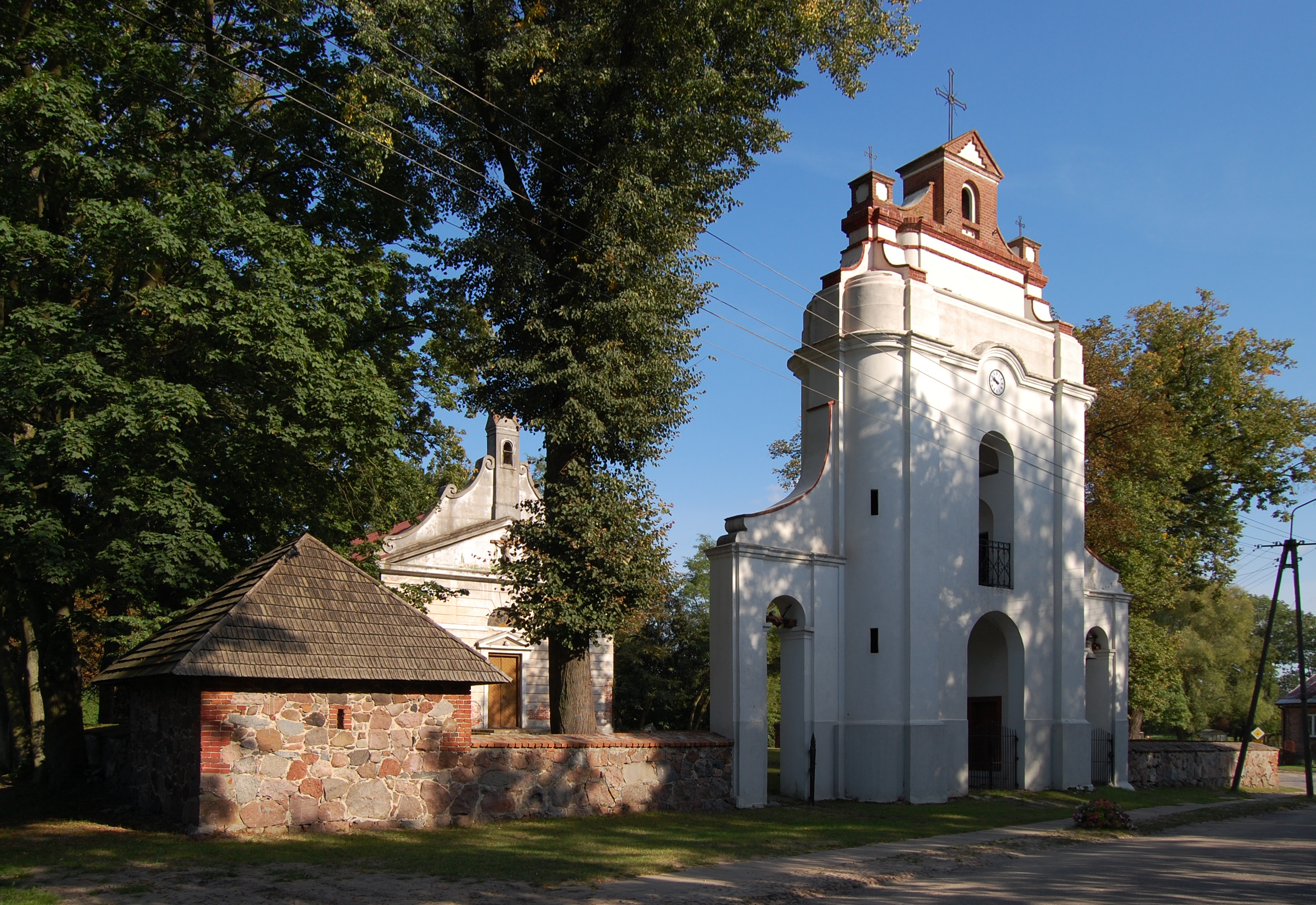
- Church of Holy Trinity

- Coat of arms

- Location within Poland
- Coordinates: 51°56′54″N 21°45′56″E
- Country: Poland
- Voivodeship: Masovian
- County: Garwolin
- Gmina: Borowie

Population
  - Total: 400

Borowie [bɔˈrɔvjɛ] is a village in Garwolin County, Masovian Voivodeship, in east-central Poland. It is the seat of the gmina (administrative district) called Gmina Borowie.
