= North–South divide =

The North-South divide can refer to:

- North–South divide of the world (Global North and Global South)
- North–South divide in Belgium
- North–South divide in China
- North–South divide in Ireland
- North–South divide in Italy
- North–South divide in Korea
- North–South divide in the Netherlands
- North–South divide in Taiwan
- North–South divide in the United Kingdom
  - North–South divide in England
  - North–South divide in Scotland
  - North–South divide in Wales
- North–South divide in the United States
- North–South divide in Vietnam

== See also ==
- East–West divide
- Southern question – Economic gap between northern and southern Italy
