= Poland A and B =

Historical, political, and cultural definitions of areas of Poland

Map showing Poland's borders pre-1938 and post-1945. The Eastern Borderlands is in gray while the Recovered Territories are in pink.

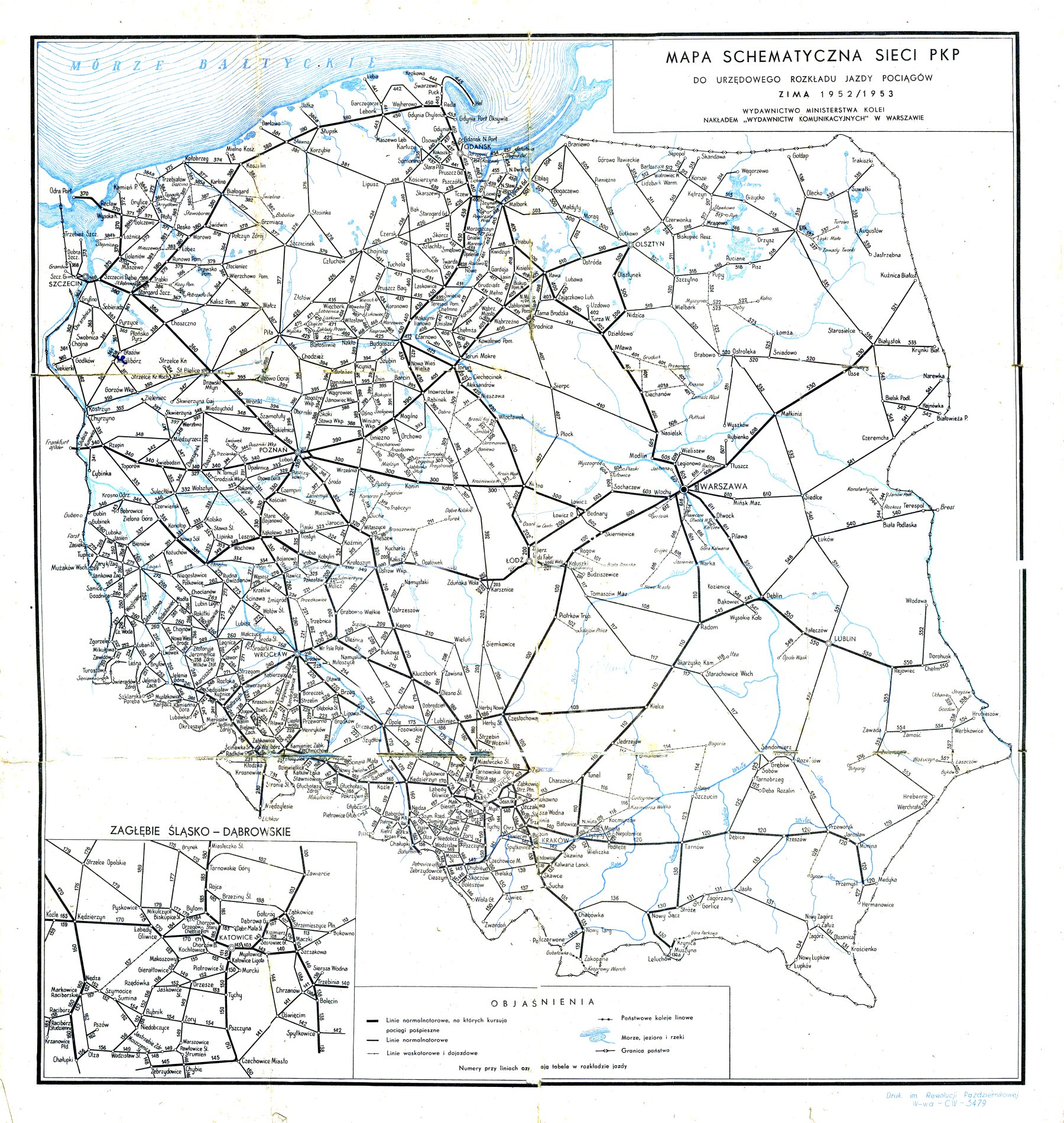
Railways of Poland in 1953, following World War II. The denser network of railways in the west is a result of traditional coal mining as well as western Poland's history as part of heavily industrialised Germany.

Poland A and B (Polish: Polska A i B) refers to the historical, political, and cultural distinction between the western and the eastern part of present-day Poland, with Poland "A", west of the Vistula, being much more developed and having faster growth than Poland "B", east of the river.

The General Secretary of the Polish Chamber of Commerce Marek Kłoczko said in his 2007 interview that the divisions are more spread out and forming three separate categories:

- Poland "A" are the metropolitan cities;
- Poland "B" is the rest of the country;
- and Poland "C" are the plains and the landscape parks east of the Vistula (Poland "Z", according to Kłoczko), which require a different treatment.

Poland's well-off cities are considered to be Warsaw, Kraków, Katowice, Gdańsk, Wrocław, and Poznań, and the ones struggling with less investment are in the east: Rzeszów, Lublin, Olsztyn and Białystok. This distinction however, is not without its issues, as not all parts of western Poland are privliged economically, and not all parts of eastern Poland are disadvantaged. As of April 2026, the voivodeships with the highest rates of unemployment are the Warmian-Masurian Voivodeship at ~10% and Podkarpackie Voivodeship, at roughly 9%, both widely acknowledged as part of Poland "B". The areas with the lowest rates of unemployment are Greater Poland, at roughly 4% and Masovia and Silesia, both at roughly 5%. It is worth noting however, that the statistics for Masovia are not as evenly spread as those of Greater Poland and Silesia, as Masovia contains the capital of Poland, Warsaw, whose capital region makes up 77% of Masovia's overall GDP and the Warsaw Capital Region makes up 60% of the region's entire population. By this metric, the employment rate in both Greater Poland and Silesia is significantly more evenly spread. Not all regions follow this distinction, as Western Pomerania, located in the northwest of Poland, has a higher unemployment rate than the rest of Poland "A", at roughly 8%.

== Distinction ==
The distinction is unofficial and in some ways oversimplified, but is widely acknowledged and discussed in Poland.

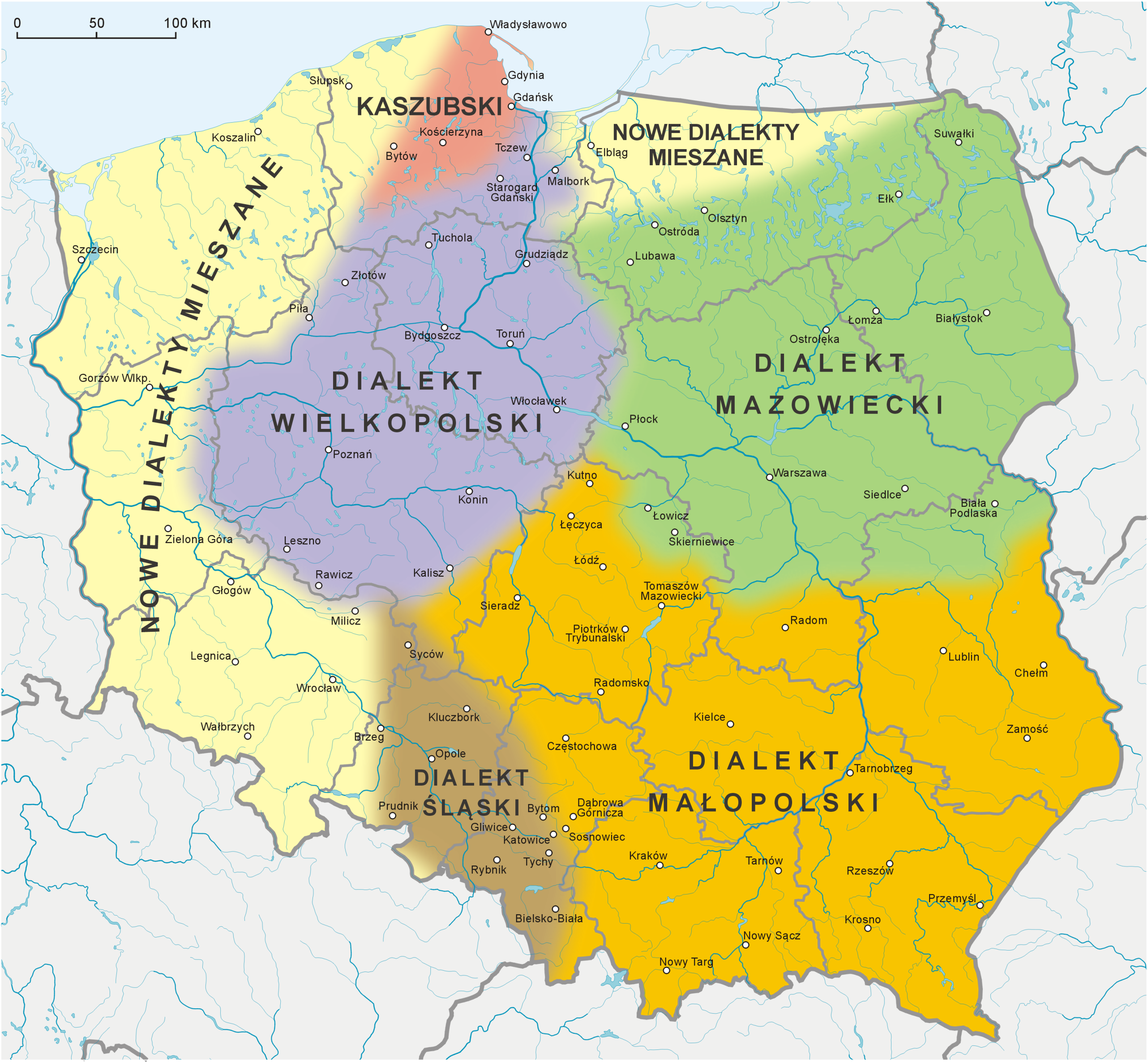
A map of the major Polish dialects.

Historically, the source of Poland "A" and "B" can be traced to the period of the partitions of Poland, and different policies of the partitioners, which resulted in a much larger industrial development of the Prussian partition, compared to the Austrian and Russian partitions (including the so-called eastern Kresy) where the imperial exploitation policies were rampant.

In this divide, Poland's borders were changing over the centuries. They moved westward after 1945, to reflect the Poland of the Piasts rather than the Poland of Jagiellonians. For instance, Warsaw was initially a settlement in eastern Poland. When it became a capital city in the 16th century, it was a central part of the Kingdom of Poland (the Crown), later western-central part of the Commonwealth. Now it is situated in the central-eastern part of Poland. This is also noticeable in the naming of the Central Industrial Region, developed during the Second Republic, which was indeed located in the centre of its borders, however, this is no longer the case, even though that the region retains its name. The slower growing western provinces are often former German regions that were already densely populated and well-developed in terms of infrastructure and industry before 1945, which meant that the Polish state did not have to industrialise these areas from the ground up, as they had to do with the eastern parts. It is also worth noting the major impact that privatisation policy of 90-2000's Poland had on more agrarian parts of Poland (located mostly in the east, with the exception of Western Pomerania), where industry has historically struggled, and the now privatised farming industry did not recover, leaving a big portion of those regions without a job, which, although significantly less noticeable than in the privatisation era, is still very much statistically noticeable.

=== Politics ===
The difference between Poland's "A" and "B" is particularly evident in the voting patterns of the two regions. During the 1990s, Poland "A" tended to favour the Democratic Left Alliance (Sojusz Lewicy Demokratycznej, or SLD), as a secular, socially liberal de facto successor in post-1989 politics to the former ruling party of the PRL. Poland "B" on the other hand voted either PSL or the Solidarity, both representing Christian-democratic values. The 2001 election was the only one when Poland A and B were not seen on the maps, as SLD won both in the east and the west of the country.

Since circa 2005, Poland saw a realignment in its political system. Residents of Poland "A" have supported the liberal conservative party Civic Platform (PO). Residents of Poland "B" (excluding the capital of Warsaw), on the other hand, tend to support the national conservative Law and Justice party (PiS). This divide tends to slightly fluctuate, however, it still is noticeable, especially when divided into the political parties of the Left and the political parties of the Centre and the Right. Warsaw and Łódź are universally accepted as exceptions to this rule, since they had almost always favoured centre to centre-left politics.

=== Gallery ===
Administrative map of Poland with results of the 2007 elections to the Senate of Poland; orange: Civic Platform, navy blue: Law and Justice

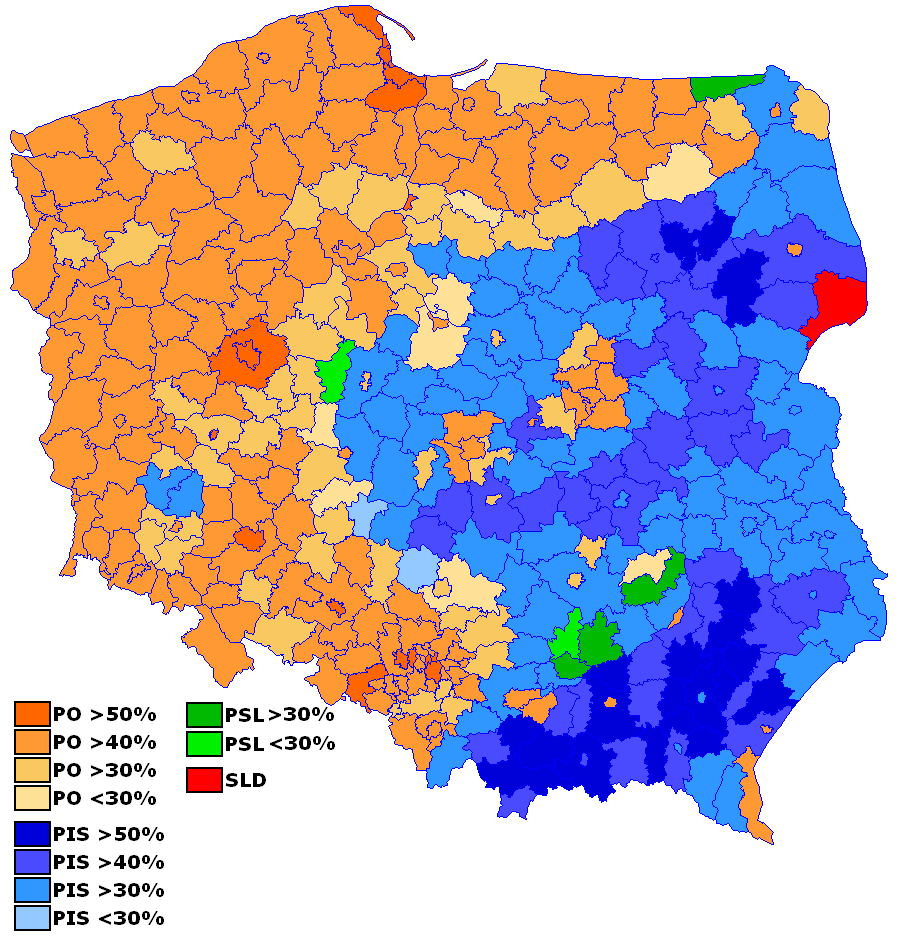
2011 Polish parliamentary election, PiS (blue), KO (orange)

2018 Polish local elections to regional assemblies (voivodeships) PiS (blue), KO (orange)

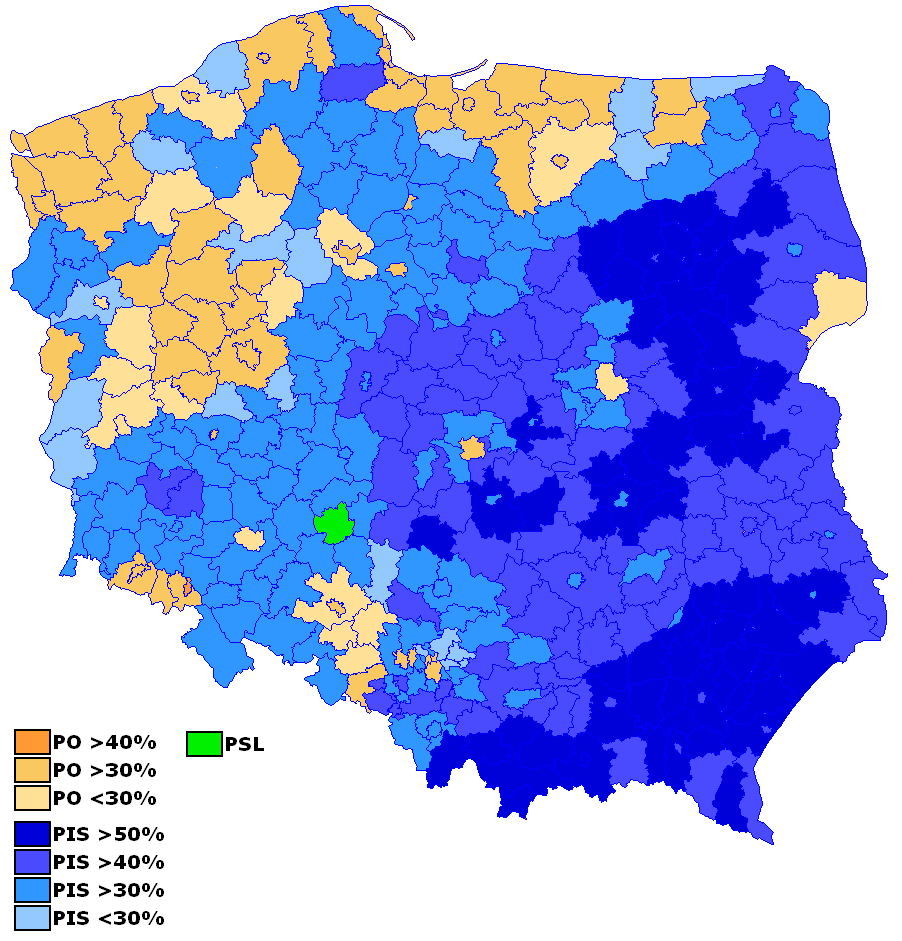
Law and Justice's main support (dark blue) is concentrated in the south-east of the country (former Russian Partition and Austrian Partition), results of the 2015 Polish parliamentary election

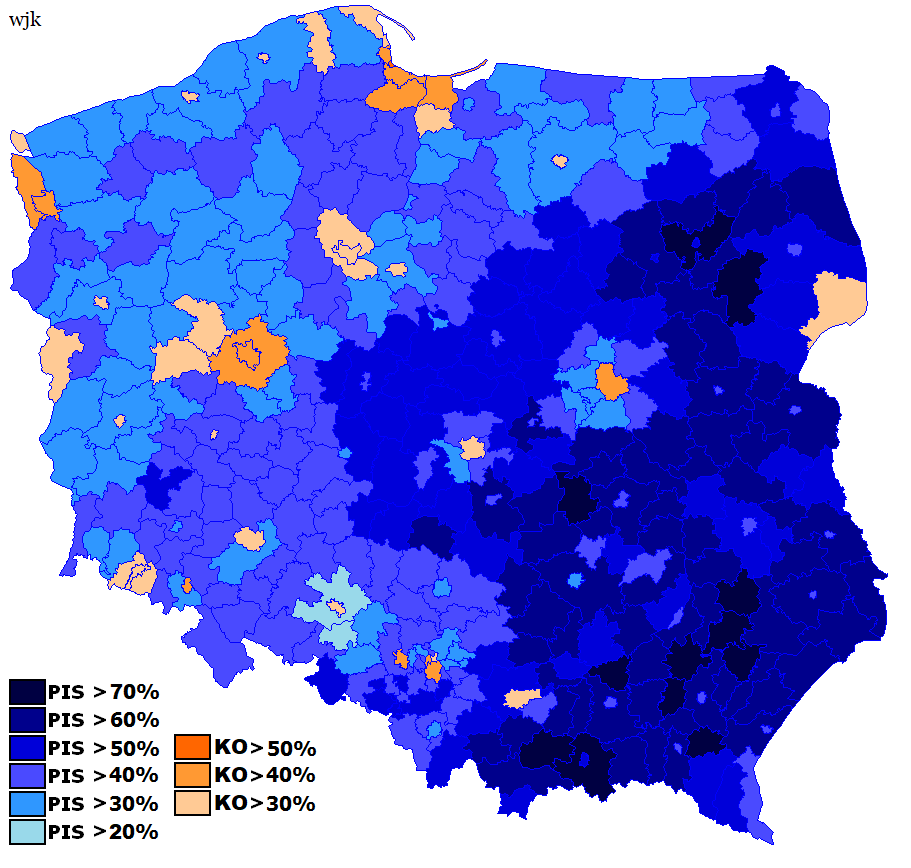
Law and Justice's main support (dark blue). PiS has seen increased support in the 2019 Polish parliamentary election

2020 Polish presidential election 1st round, PiS (blue), KO (orange)

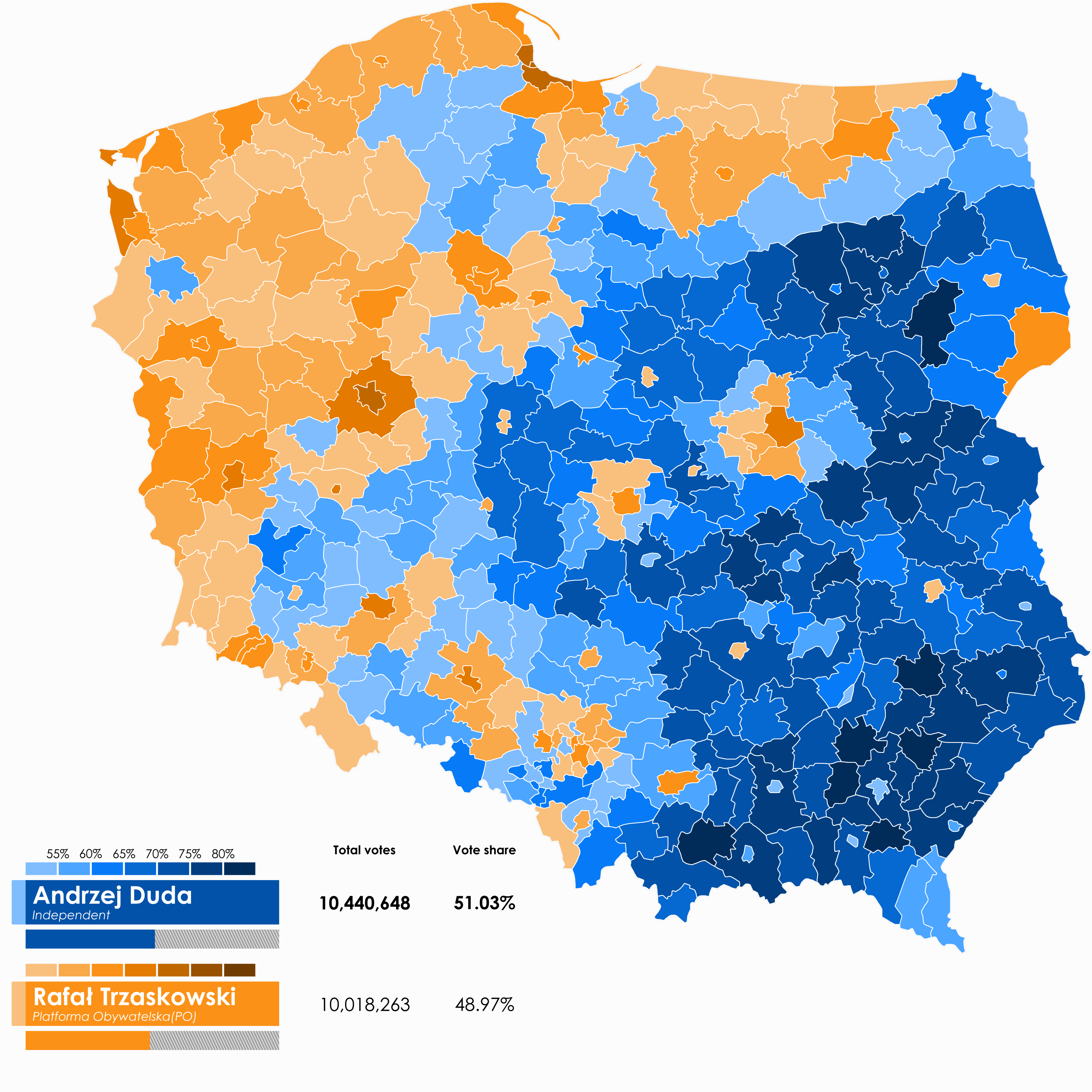
2020 Polish presidential election second round, PiS (blue), KO (orange)

2023 Polish parliamentary election – Senate results, PiS (blue), Opposition (orange)

2024 Polish local elections to regional assemblies (constitutencies) PiS (blue), KO (orange)

2025 Polish presidential election second round, PiS (blue), KO (orange)

== In popular culture ==
On 26 January 2016, the album Karabin by Maria Peszek was released. It includes the song "Polska A, B, C i D". A day later, the song was released as a single and it peaked at number one on the Polish Radio Three Chart.

Poland "B" is mentioned in the 2020 Polish horror film Nobody Sleeps in the Woods Tonight.

== See also ==
- Phantom border
- List of Polish voivodeships by GRP
- Partitions of Poland
- Recovered Territories
- Other East–West divides, the global North–South divide, and similar socioeconomic divides in:
  - Belgium
  - Italy
  - Mainland China
  - Korea
  - Taiwan
  - the United States (Red and Blue)
  - the United Kingdom
  - Western Ukraine and Eastern Ukraine
  - Western Indonesia and Eastern Indonesia
  - Western Germany and Eastern Germany
