= Markot =

Markot (Ruch Wychodzenia z Bezdomnosci - Movement Out of Homelessness) is a Polish social movement, aimed at helping homeless people across Poland. It was founded by Marek Kotanski, a charity worker and campaigner on behalf of disadvantaged people and was based on an idea from late 1980s and early 1990s. First center of the movement was opened in a village of Lutynka, another one was opened in Jeleni Ruczaj, then a School of Life was founded in the village of Wandzin. The movement was legalized in 1994, in the same year in Warsaw, a Center of Help was opened. It is estimated that in the 1990s, some 50% of beds for Polish homeless persons were administered by Markot. Marek Kotanski, leader of the movement, established Day of the Homeless (April 14) as well as an honorary title Friend of the Homeless.
