= Social Insurance Institution (Poland) =

Polish state social insurance organisation

- Zakład Ubezpieczeń Społecznych

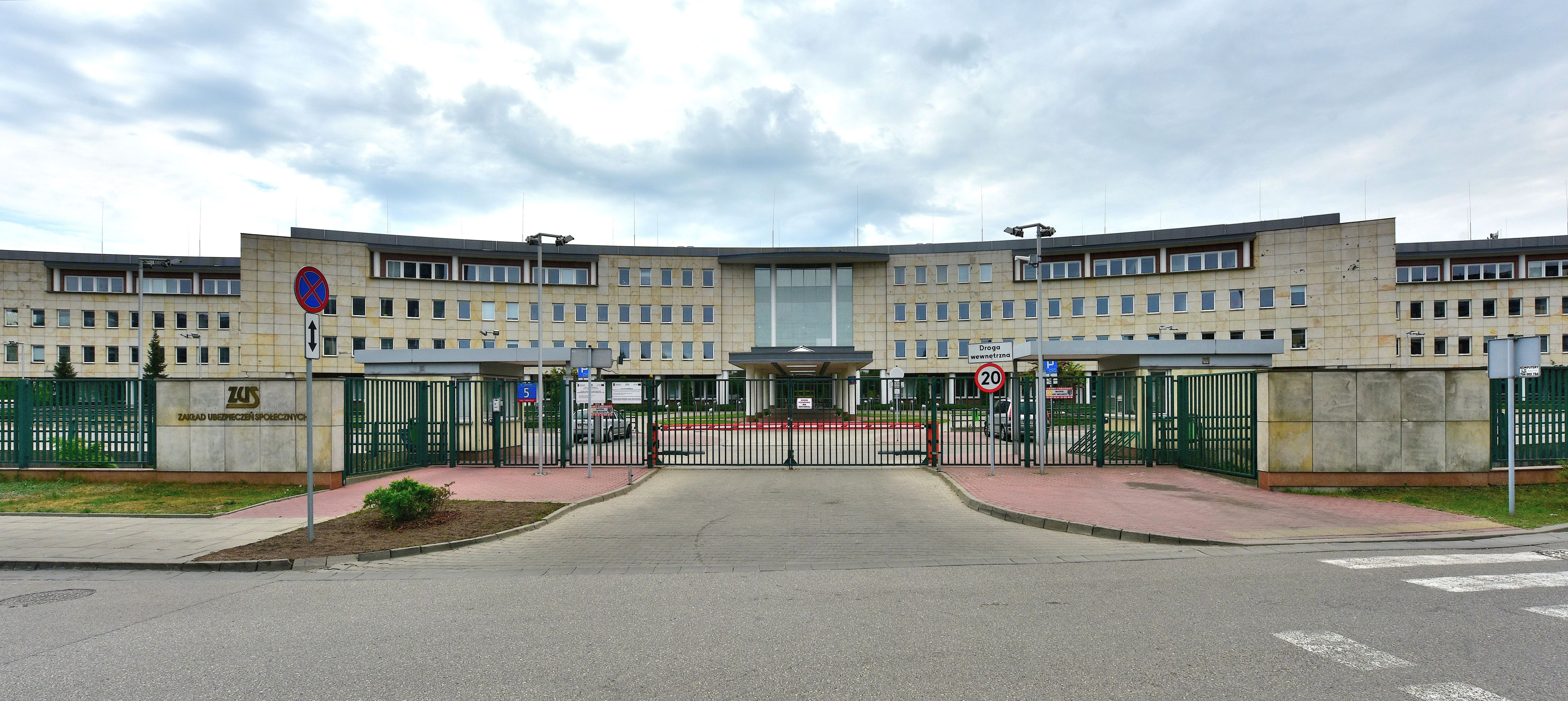
- ZUS Headquarters, Szamocka 5, Warsaw

Agency overview
- Formed: 24 October 1934
- Headquarters: Warsaw, Poland
- Agency executive: Zbigniew Derdziuk

The Social Insurance Institution (Polish: Zakład Ubezpieczeń Społecznych, ZUS) is a Polish state organisation responsible for social insurance matters which has been operating since 1934. ZUS is supervised by the Ministry of Labour and Social Policy. ZUS carries out the following tasks:

- establishing entitlement to social insurance benefits,
- paying out social insurance benefits,
- assessing and collecting social insurance and health insurance contributions and contributions to the Labour Fund and the Fund of Guaranteed Employee Benefits,
- maintaining individual accounts for those insured and the accounts of contribution payers.

ZUS is organised into field organisational units which include: branches, inspectorates and field offices. The national network of ZUS organisational units includes 325 units, of which 43 are branch offices, 216 are inspectorates and 66 are local offices.
