= Luzki =

Luzki may refer to the following places:

- Łuzki, Łosice County, Masovian Voivodeship (eastern Poland)
- Łuzki, Sokołów County, Masovian Voivodeship (eastern Poland)
- Łużki, Masovian Voivodeship (east-central Poland)
- Łużki, Pomeranian Voivodeship (northern Poland)
- Lužki (Polish: Łużki), Vitebsk Region (northern Belarus)
