= Antonówka =

Antonówka is the name of several settlements in Poland:

- Antonówka, Lublin Voivodeship
- Antonówka, Masovian Voivodeship

== See also ==
- Antoniówka (disambiguation)
- Antonovka
- Antonivka (disambiguation)
