= Michalin =

Michalin may refer to the following places:

- Michalin, Aleksandrów County in Kuyavian-Pomeranian Voivodeship (north-central Poland)
- Michalin, Nakło County in Kuyavian-Pomeranian Voivodeship (north-central Poland)
- Michalin (Gąsiory) in Masovian Voivodeship (east-central Poland)
- Michalin (Janówek) in Masovian Voivodeship (east-central Poland)
- Michalin, Wyszków County in Masovian Voivodeship (east-central Poland)
- Michalin, Zwoleń County in Masovian Voivodeship (east-central Poland)
- Michalin, Żyrardów County in Masovian Voivodeship (east-central Poland)
- Michalin, Pomeranian Voivodeship (north Poland)
- Michalin, Polish name for Mykhailyn, Vinnytsia Oblast, village in Ukraine
