= Piastów (disambiguation) =

Piastów is a town in Masovian Voivodeship, east-central Poland.

Piastów may also refer to:

- Piastów, Garwolin County, a village in Masovian Voivodeship, east-central Poland
- Piastów, Przasnysz County, a village in Masovian Voivodeship, east-central Poland
- Piastów, Radom County, a village in Masovian Voivodeship, east-central Poland
