= Kotłówka =

Kotłówka may refer to the following places:

- Kotłówka, Masovian Voivodeship (east-central Poland)
- Kotłówka, Podlaskie Voivodeship (north-east Poland)
- Kotłówka, Pomeranian Voivodeship (north Poland)
