= Ryszard Chachulski =

Polish sculptor (1931–2012)

- Born: 19 February 1931; Łuzki, Poland
- Died: 9 April 2012 (aged 81); Szczecin, Poland
- Education: Academy of Fine Arts in Gdańsk; Jan Matejko Academy of Fine Arts in Kraków
- Occupation: Sculptor
- Style: Modern art

Ryszard Chachulski (Polish: [ˈrɘ̟.ʂart xaˈxul.ski]; 19 February 1931 – 9 April 2012) was a modern art sculptor based in Szczecin, Poland. Among his best known works are the Sailor Monument and the Railwayman Monument in Szczecin.

== Biography ==
Ryszard Chachulski was born on 19 February 1931 in Łuzki, a village now located in Łosice County, Masovian Voivodeship, Poland.

In 1934, his family moved to Kraków, and later during World War II, they settled in Myszków. He has graduated from a middle school in Malbork, and from a fine arts high school in Gdynia. In 1953, he has graduated from the National University of Fine Arts in Sopot (now the Academy of Fine Arts in Gdańsk), and in 1957, from the Jan Matejko Academy of Fine Arts in Kraków. In 1964, he has settled in Szczecin, where he opened his art studio.

Chachulski was a modern art sculptor, and created works such as the Railwayman Monument in Szczecin (1964), the monument of Triglav in Wolin (1967), the sculpture Dancing Pair in Szczecin (1975), the Sailor Monument in Szczecin (1980), the sculpture New and Old in Szczecin (1982), and the monument of Svetovit in Myszków (1989; moved to Częstochowa in 2011). He was also author of many sculptures and decorations on the ships of the Polish Ocean Lines and Polsteam, and made busts of Stefan Jaracz, Stanisław Wyspiański, Mieczysław Karłowicz, and Nicolaus Copernicus for Szczecin cultural institutions.

Chachulski died on 9 April 2012 in Szczecin, Poland.

== Works ==
Picture	Year	Title	Location
	1964	Railwayman Monument	Szczecin, Poland
	1967	Triglav Monument	Wolin, Poland
	1975	Dancing Pair	Szczecin, Poland
	1980	Sailor Monument	Szczecin, Poland
	1982	New and Old	Szczecin, Poland
	1989	Svetovit Monument	Częstochowa, Poland

== Awards and decorations ==
- Gold Cross of Merit (2005)
