= Bogumiłów =

Bogumiłów may refer to the following places:

- Bogumiłów, Bełchatów County in Łódź Voivodeship (central Poland)
- Bogumiłów, Piotrków County in Łódź Voivodeship (central Poland)
- Bogumiłów, Sieradz County in Łódź Voivodeship (central Poland)
- Bogumiłów, Greater Poland Voivodeship (west-central Poland)
- Bogumiłów, Lubusz Voivodeship (west Poland)
