= Podwierzbie =

Podwierzbie may refer to the following places:

- Podwierzbie, Lublin Voivodeship (east Poland)
- Podwierzbie, Garwolin County in Masovian Voivodeship (east-central Poland)
- Podwierzbie, Gmina Żelechów in Masovian Voivodeship (east-central Poland)
- Podwierzbie, Sierpc County in Masovian Voivodeship (east-central Poland)
