= Łomnica, Garwolin County =

Łomnica
- Village
- Location within Poland
- Coordinates: 51°49′48″N 21°51′25″E
- Country: Poland
- Voivodeship: Masovian
- County: Garwolin
- Gmina: Żelechów
- Population: 284

Łomnica [wɔmˈnit͡sa] is a village in the administrative district of Gmina Żelechów, within Garwolin County, Masovian Voivodeship, in east-central Poland.
