= Shalom Zysman =

Israeli politician

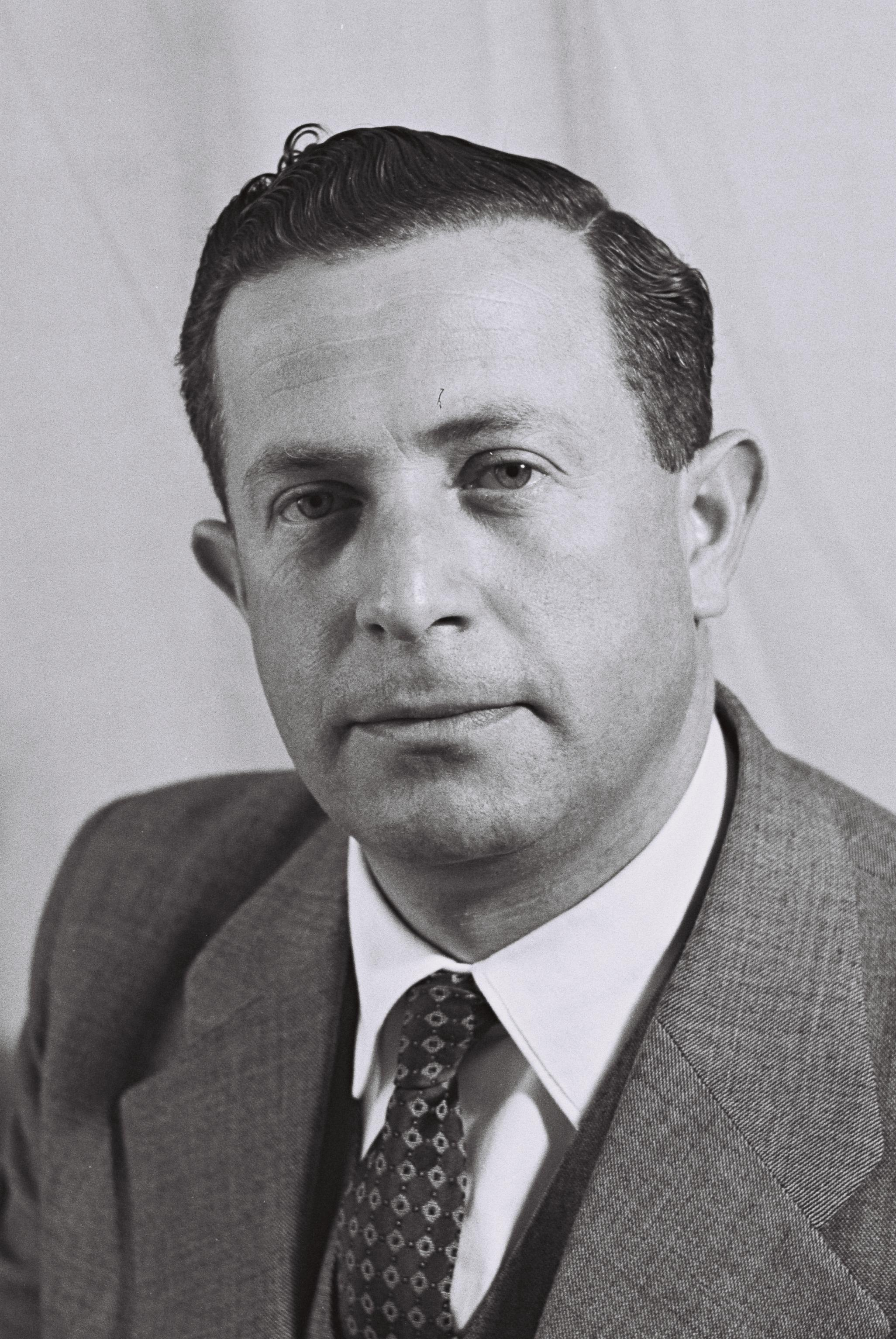
- Zysman in 1951

Faction represented in the Knesset
- 1951–1955: General Zionists

Personal details
- Born: 14 March 1914 Żelechów, Russian Empire
- Died: 12 February 1967 (aged 52)

Shalom Zysman (Hebrew: שלום זיסמן; 14 March 1914 – 12 February 1967) was an Israeli politician who served as a member of the Knesset for the General Zionists between 1951 and 1955.

== Biography ==
Born in Żelechów in the Russian Empire (today in Poland), Zysman was educated at a gymnasium, before studying law at the University of Warsaw.

He emigrated to Mandatory Palestine at the age of 19, where he joined the Haganah and was amongst the founders of Bamahane, the Haganah (and now IDF) publication. During World War II, he was a sergeant major in the Jewish Brigade, and served in the Western Desert in North Africa, and on the Italian front. In the 1948 Arab–Israeli War he was a major, and deputy head of the publicity department. He published a book, Know Your Weapon.

In 1951, he was elected to the Knesset on the General Zionists' list, but lost his seat in the 1955 elections. In the same year he was elected to Ramat Gan city council and became the city's deputy mayor. Zysman also served as chairman of the Israeli branch of Maccabi's directorate, as well as being a member of the World Maccabi Union's central committee. He chaired the Israeli Olympic Committee, and was a director of the Asian Federation for Sports.

He died in 1967 at the age of 52.
