= Czyżów, Łódź Voivodeship =

Czyżów
- Village
- Location within Poland
- Coordinates: 51°12′48″N 19°23′10″E
- Country: Poland
- Voivodeship: Łódź
- County: Bełchatów
- Gmina: Kleszczów

Czyżów [ˈt͡ʂɨʐuf] is a village in the administrative district of Gmina Kleszczów, within Bełchatów County, Łódź Voivodeship, in central Poland.
