= Budki Kotłowskie =

- Village
- Location within Poland
- Coordinates: 51°47′52″N 21°55′30″E
- Country: Poland
- Voivodeship: Masovian
- County: Garwolin
- Gmina: Żelechów

Budki Kotłowskie [ˈbutki kɔˈtwɔfskʲɛ] is a village in the administrative district of Gmina Żelechów, within Garwolin County, Masovian Voivodeship, in east-central Poland.
