= Statue of the Railwayman =

Monument in Szczecin, Poland

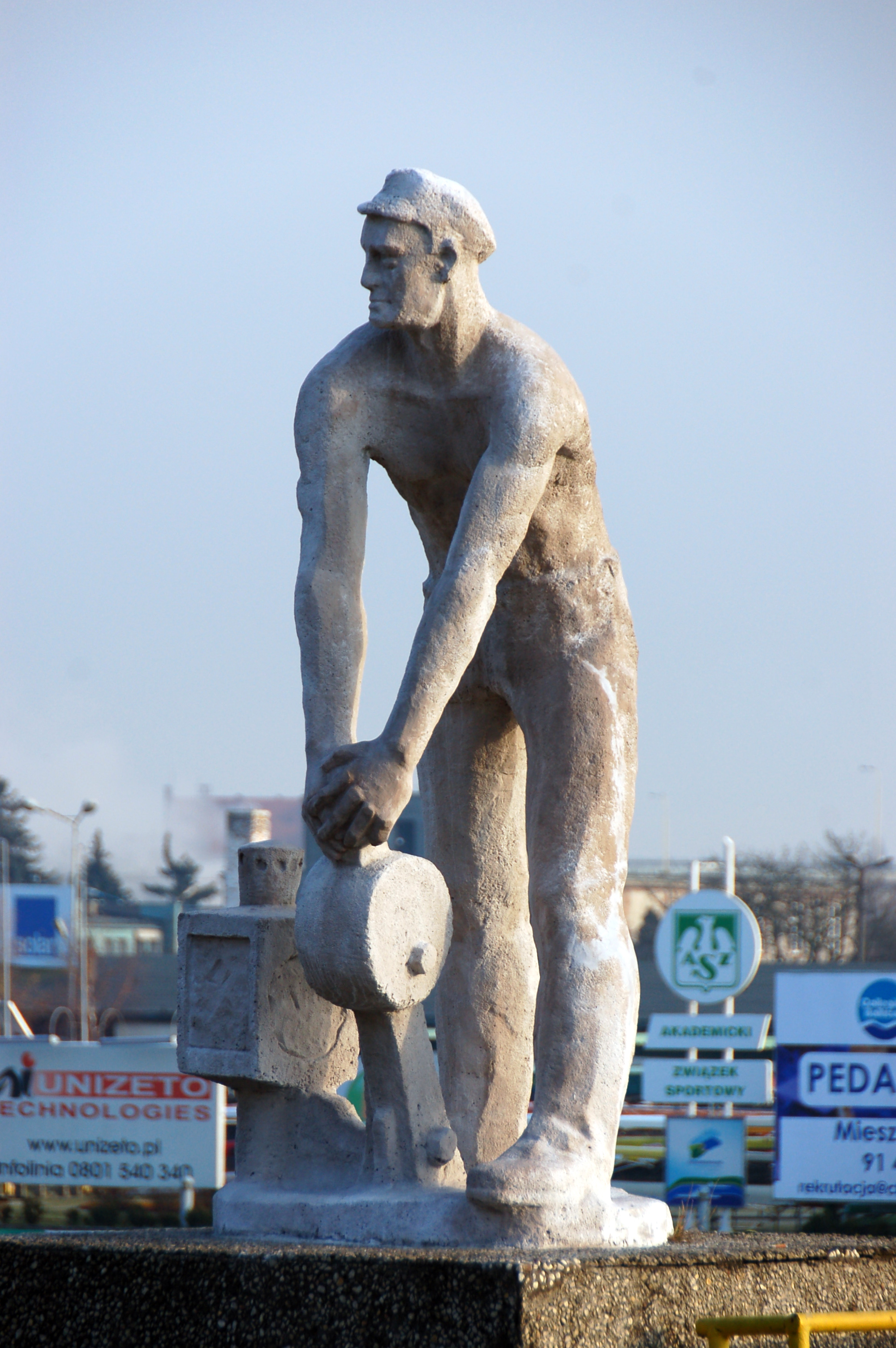
- The statue in 2010.
- Interactive map of Statue of the Railwayman
- Location: Kolumba Street, New Town, Szczecin, West Pomeranian Voivodeship, Poland
- Coordinates: 53°25′08″N 14°33′09″E
- Designer: Ryszard Chachulski
- Type: Statue
- Material: Artificial stone (statue); concreate (pedestal)
- Height: 367 cm (total); 245 cm (statue)
- Opening date: 22 July 1964
- Dedicated to: Railway workers

The statue of the Railwayman (Polish: Pomnik Kolejarza), also known as Onto the New Tracks (Polish: Na nowe tory), is a monument by Ryszard Chachulski in the city of Szczecin, Poland, located at the Kolumba Street in front of Szczecin Główny railway station. It was completed in 1964, and depicts a railway worker.

== History ==
The monument was sculpted by Ryszard Chachulski, and unveiled on 22 July 1964, as part of the celebration of the 20th anniversary of the publication of the Manifesto of the Polish Committee of National Liberation. The sculpture underwent restoration in 2011.

== Description ==
Chachulski titled the work Onto the New Tracks (Polish: Na nowe tory). The monument depicts a topless railwayman operating a switch stand, his head turned towards the entrance of Szczecin Główny railway station. Carved from artificial stone, the statue stands on a concrete pedestal. The total height is 367 cm (144 in), while the statue itself is 245 cm (96 in).

== Gallery ==
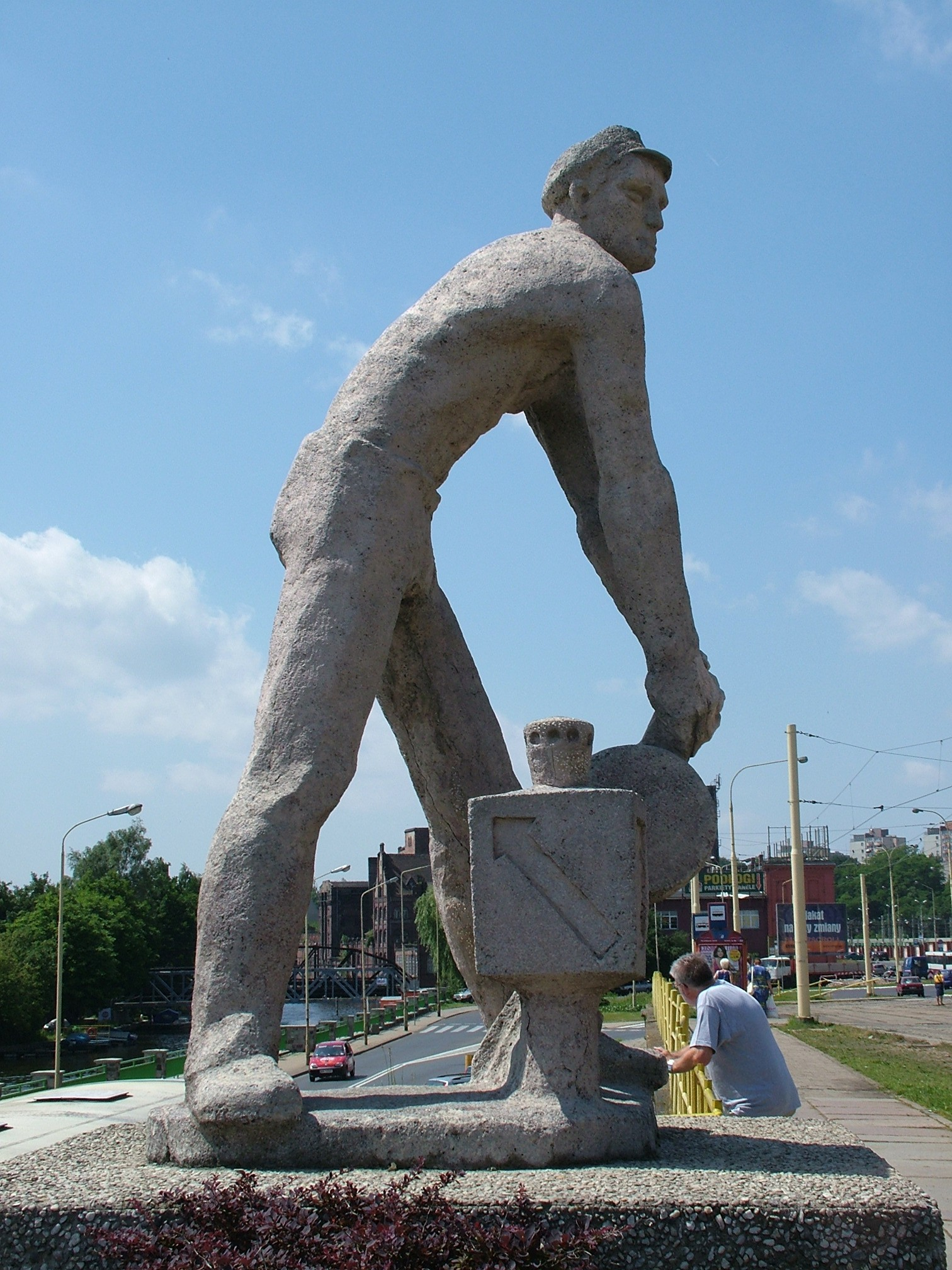
The monument in 2006.

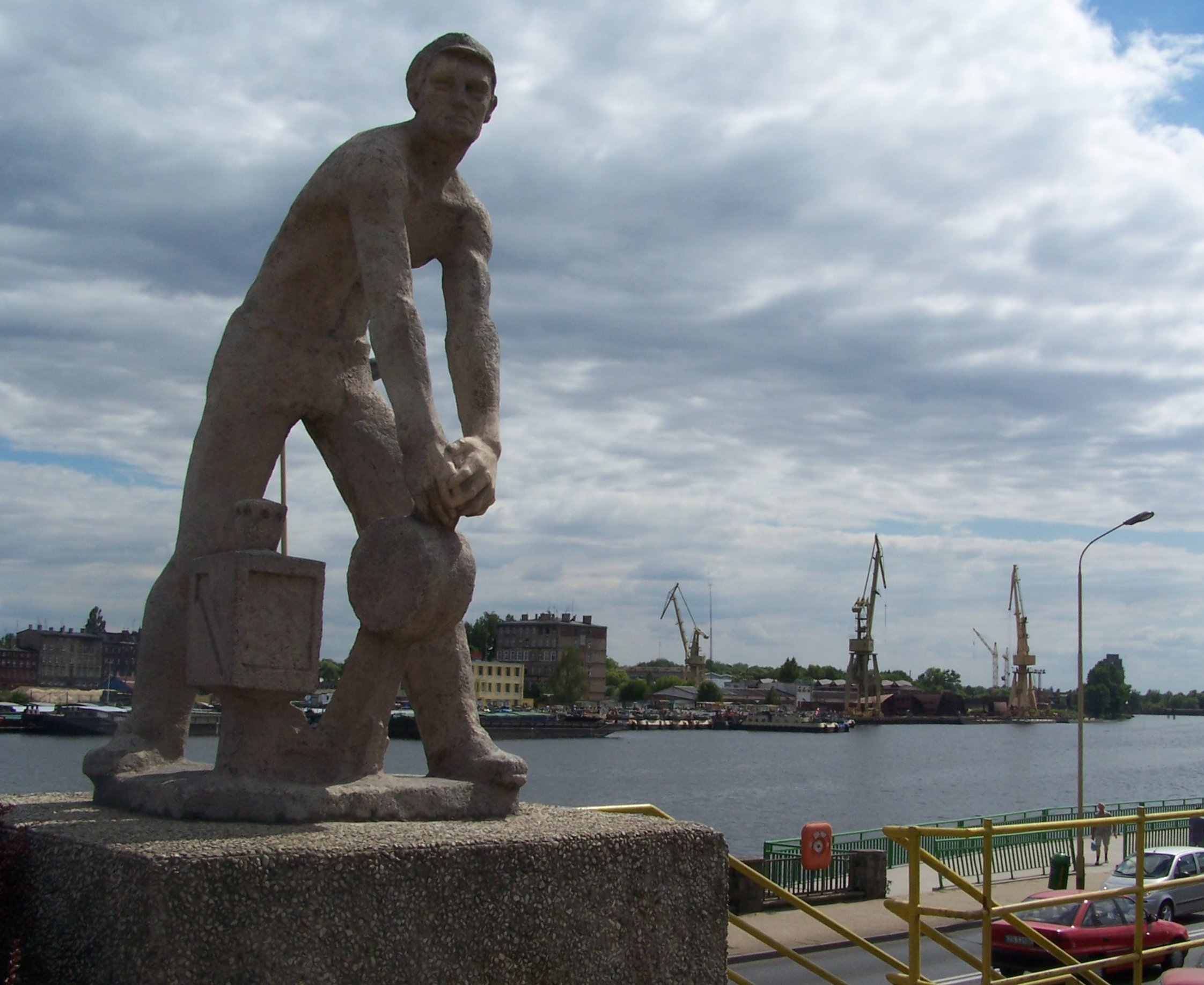
The monument in 2006.

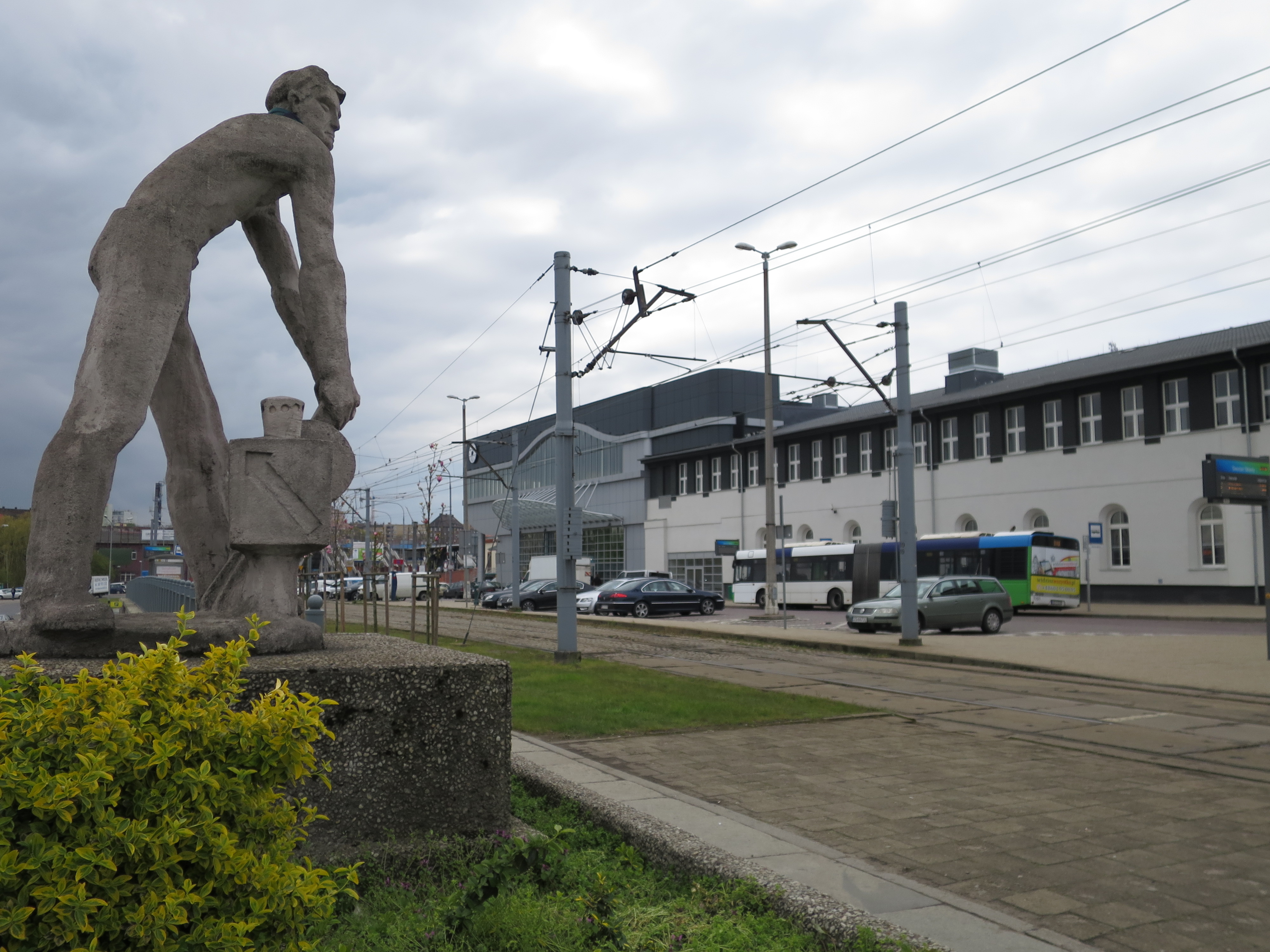
The monument and the railway station entrance in 2016.

== Bibliography ==
- Encyklopedia Szczecina, 2nd volume, University of Szczecin, Szczecin, 2000, ISBN 83-7241-089-5
- Szczecin – miasto. Pomniki, rzeźby plenerowe, tablice pamiątkowe. Dokumentacja Miejskiego Konserwatora Zabytków, Szczecin, 1996, record card no. 46.
