= Kontrowers, Masovian Voivodeship =

Kontrowers
- Village
- Location within Poland
- Coordinates: 51°47′21″N 21°48′38″E
- Country: Poland
- Voivodeship: Masovian
- County: Garwolin
- Gmina: Żelechów

Kontrowers [kɔnˈtrɔvɛrs] is a village in the administrative district of Gmina Żelechów, within Garwolin County, Masovian Voivodeship, in east-central Poland.
