= Łękińsko =

- Village
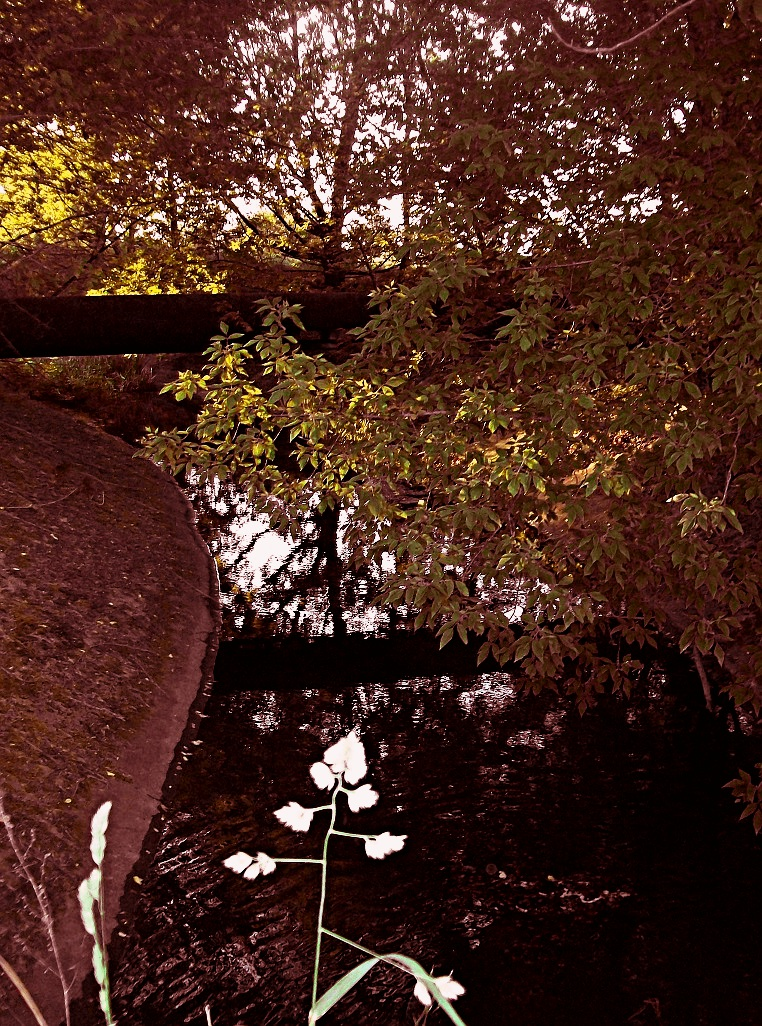

- Location within Poland
- Coordinates: 51°13′N 19°21′E
- Country: Poland
- Voivodeship: Łódź
- County: Bełchatów
- Gmina: Kleszczów
- Population: 560

Łękińsko [wɛnˈkiɲskɔ] is a village in the administrative district of Gmina Kleszczów, within Bełchatów County, Łódź Voivodeship, in central Poland.
