= Zakrzówek, Garwolin County =

Zakrzówek
- Village
- Location within Poland
- Coordinates: 51°48′12″N 21°56′14″E
- Country: Poland
- Voivodeship: Masovian
- County: Garwolin
- Gmina: Żelechów
- Population: 153

Zakrzówek [zaˈkʂuvɛk] is a village in the administrative district of Gmina Żelechów, within Garwolin County, Masovian Voivodeship, in east-central Poland.
