= Dąbrowa, Gmina Kleszczów =

Dąbrowa
- Settlement
- Location within Poland
- Coordinates: 51°15′06″N 19°21′31″E
- Country: Poland
- Voivodeship: Łódź
- County: Bełchatów
- Gmina: Kleszczów

Dąbrowa [dɔmˈbrɔva] is a settlement in the administrative district of Gmina Kleszczów, within Bełchatów County, Łódź Voivodeship, in central Poland.
