= Nowy Goniwilk =

- Village
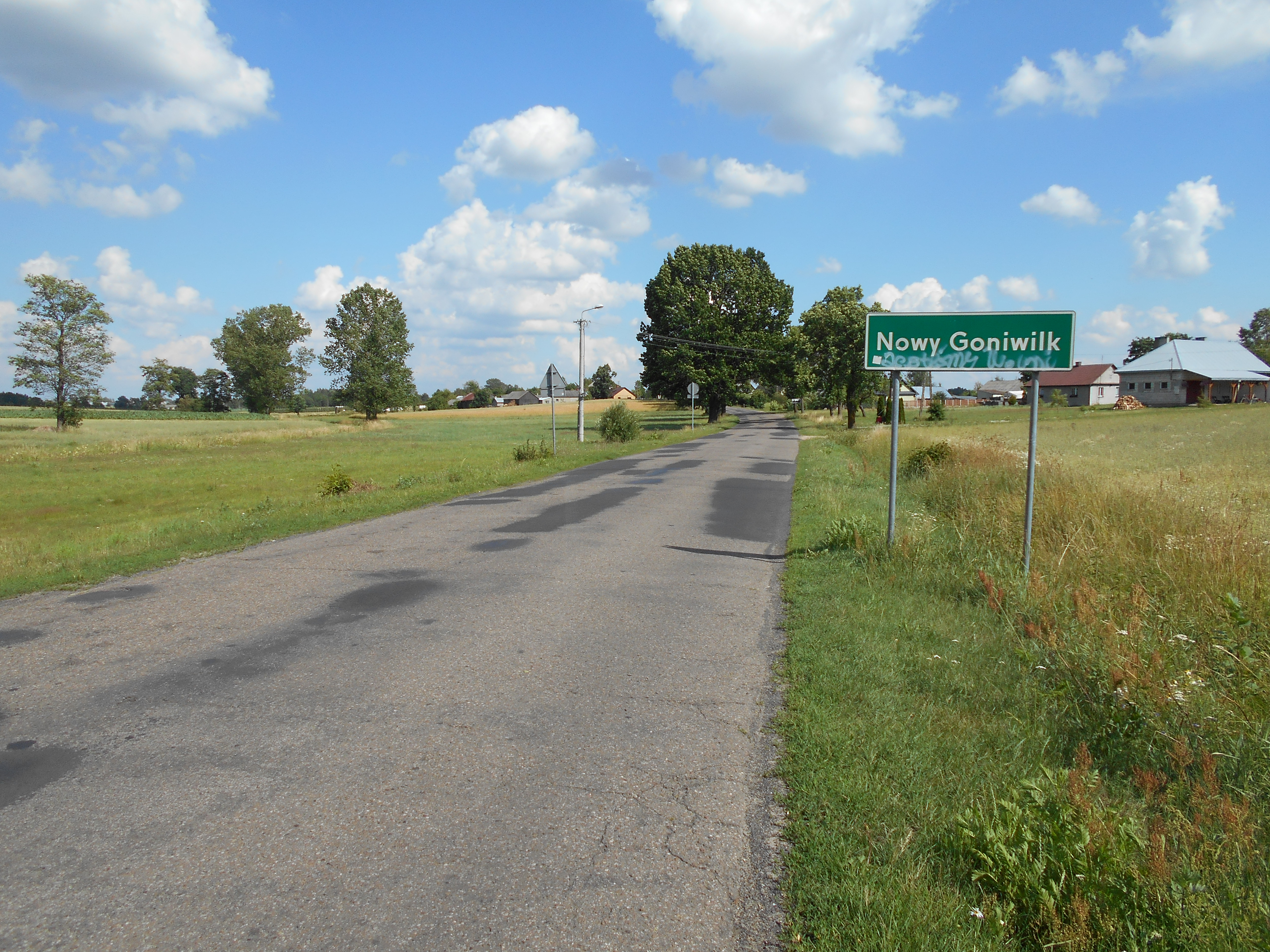

- Location within Poland
- Coordinates: 51°49′N 21°49′E
- Country: Poland
- Voivodeship: Masovian
- County: Garwolin
- Gmina: Żelechów

Population
  - Total: 314
- Time zone: UTC+1 (CET)
  - Summer (DST): UTC+2 (CEST)

Nowy Goniwilk [ˈnɔvɨ ɡɔˈnivilk] is a village in the administrative district of Gmina Żelechów, within Garwolin County, Masovian Voivodeship, in east-central Poland.

Six Polish citizens were murdered by Nazi Germany in Nowy Goniwilk and Stary Goniwilk during World War II.
