= Antoniówka =

Antoniówka may refer to the following places:

- Antoniówka, Krasnystaw County in Lublin Voivodeship (east Poland)
- Antoniówka, Lubartów County in Lublin Voivodeship (east Poland)
- Antoniówka, Gmina Krzczonów in Lublin Voivodeship (east Poland)
- Antoniówka, Bełchatów County in Łódź Voivodeship (central Poland)
- Antoniówka, Opoczno County in Łódź Voivodeship (central Poland)
- Antoniówka, Gmina Wysokie in Lublin Voivodeship (east Poland)
- Antoniówka, Gmina Krynice, Tomaszów County in Lublin Voivodeship (east Poland)
- Antoniówka, Zamość County in Lublin Voivodeship (east Poland)
- Antoniówka, Stalowa Wola County in Subcarpathian Voivodeship (south-east Poland)
- Antoniówka, Zwoleń County in Masovian Voivodeship (east-central Poland)
- Antoniówka, Radom County in Masovian Voivodeship (east-central Poland)
