= Gmina Żelechów =

Gmina Żelechów Żelechów Commune
- Gmina
- Coat of arms
- Interactive map of Gmina Żelechów
- Coordinates (Żelechów): 51°48′N 21°54′E
- Country: Poland
- Voivodeship: Masovian
- County: Garwolin
- Seat: Żelechów

Area
  - Total: 87.64 km^{2} (33.84 sq mi)

Population (2006)
  - Total: 8,390
  - Density: 95.7/km^{2} (248/sq mi)
  - Urban: 4,016
  - Rural: 4,374
- Website: http://www.zelechow.pl/

Gmina Żelechów is an urban-rural gmina (administrative district) in Garwolin County, Masovian Voivodeship, in east-central Poland. Its seat is the town of Żelechów, which lies approximately 22 kilometres (14 mi) south-east of Garwolin and 78 km (48 mi) south-east of Warsaw.

The gmina covers an area of 87.64 square kilometres (33.8 sq mi), and as of 2006 its total population is 8,390 (out of which the population of Żelechów amounts to 4,016, and the population of the rural part of the gmina is 4,374).

== Villages ==
Apart from the town of Żelechów, Gmina Żelechów contains the villages and settlements of Antonówka, Bród, Budki, Budki Kotłowskie, Gąsiory, Goniwilk-Las, Gózdek, Huta Żelechowska, Janówek, Jezioro, Józefów, Kalinów, Kałuskie, Kontrowers, Kotłówka, Łomnica, Łużki, Michalin (Gąsiory), Michalin (Janówek), Nad Rzeką, Nowy Goniwilk, Nowy Kębłów, Ostrożeń Trzeci, Piastów, Pod Lasem, Podlasie, Podwierzbie, Sokolniki, Stary Goniwilk, Stary Kębłów, Stefanów, Władysławów, Wola Żelechowska and Zakrzówek.

== Neighbouring gminas ==
Gmina Żelechów is bordered by the gminas of Górzno, Kłoczew, Miastków Kościelny, Sobolew, Trojanów and Wola Mysłowska.
