= Żłobnica =

- Village
- Location within Poland
- Coordinates: 51°14′N 19°15′E
- Country: Poland
- Voivodeship: Łódź
- County: Bełchatów
- Gmina: Kleszczów

Żłobnica [ʐwɔbˈnit͡sa] is a village in the administrative district of Gmina Kleszczów, within Bełchatów County, Łódź Voivodeship, in central Poland.
