= Rogowiec, Łódź Voivodeship =

Rogowiec
- Village
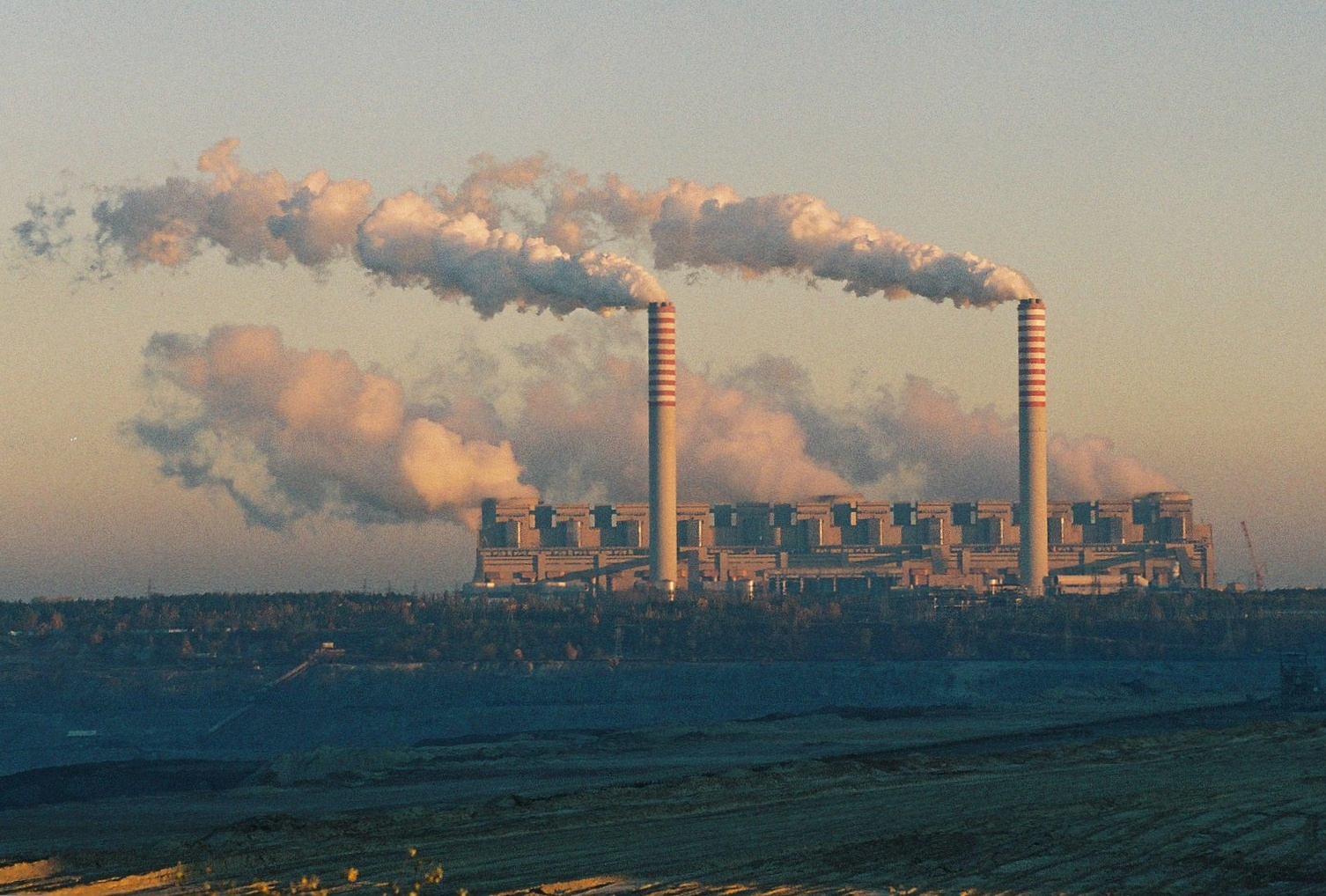
- Bełchatów Power Station next to the village

- Location within Poland
- Coordinates: 51°17′N 19°18′E
- Country: Poland
- Voivodeship: Łódź
- County: Bełchatów
- Gmina: Kleszczów
- Population: 50

Rogowiec [rɔˈɡɔvjɛt͡s] is a village in the administrative district of Gmina Kleszczów, within Bełchatów County, Łódź Voivodeship, in central Poland.
