= Gózdek, Garwolin County =

Gózdek
- Village
- Location within Poland
- Coordinates: 51°49′39″N 21°53′0″E
- Country: Poland
- Voivodeship: Masovian
- County: Garwolin
- Gmina: Żelechów
- Population: 270

Gózdek [ˈɡuzdɛk] is a village in the administrative district of Gmina Żelechów, within Garwolin County, Masovian Voivodeship, in east-central Poland.
