= Stary Goniwilk =

- Village
- Location within Poland
- Coordinates: 51°49′38″N 21°49′40″E
- Country: Poland
- Voivodeship: Masovian
- County: Garwolin
- Gmina: Żelechów

Population
  - Total: 266
- Time zone: UTC+1 (CET)
  - Summer (DST): UTC+2 (CEST)

Stary Goniwilk [ˈstarɨ ɡɔˈnivilk] is a village in the administrative district of Gmina Żelechów, within Garwolin County, Masovian Voivodeship, in east-central Poland.

Six Polish citizens were murdered by Nazi Germany in Stary Goniwilk and Nowy Goniwilk during World War II.
