= Sokolniki, Garwolin County =

Sokolniki
- Village
- Location within Poland
- Coordinates: 51°46′5″N 21°49′5″E
- Country: Poland
- Voivodeship: Masovian
- County: Garwolin
- Gmina: Żelechów
- Population: 129

Sokolniki [sɔkɔlˈɲikʲi] is a village in the administrative district of Gmina Żelechów, within Garwolin County, Masovian Voivodeship, in east-central Poland.
