= Biłgoraj, Łódź Voivodeship =

Biłgoraj
- Settlement
- Location within Poland
- Coordinates: 51°16′40″N 19°18′52″E
- Country: Poland
- Voivodeship: Łódź
- County: Bełchatów
- Gmina: Kleszczów

Biłgoraj [biu̯ˈɡɔrai̯] is a settlement in the administrative district of Gmina Kleszczów, within Bełchatów County, Łódź Voivodeship, in central Poland.
