= Bród, Garwolin County =

Bród
- Village
- Location within Poland
- Coordinates: 51°50′13″N 21°55′5″E
- Country: Poland
- Voivodeship: Masovian
- County: Garwolin
- Gmina: Żelechów

Bród [brut] is a village in the administrative district of Gmina Żelechów, within Garwolin County, Masovian Voivodeship, in east-central Poland.
