= Stefanowizna =

- Settlement
- Location within Poland
- Coordinates: 51°15′57″N 19°22′15″E
- Country: Poland
- Voivodeship: Łódź
- County: Bełchatów
- Gmina: Kleszczów

Stefanowizna [stɛfanɔˈvizna] is a settlement in the administrative district of Gmina Kleszczów, within Bełchatów County, Łódź Voivodeship, in central Poland.
