= Podlasie, Garwolin County =

Podlasie
- Village
- Location within Poland
- Coordinates: 51°49′25″N 21°47′45″E
- Country: Poland
- Voivodeship: Masovian
- County: Garwolin
- Gmina: Żelechów

Podlasie [pɔdˈlaɕɛ] is a village in the administrative district of Gmina Żelechów, within Garwolin County, Masovian Voivodeship, in east-central Poland.
