= Isaac Meir Weissenberg =

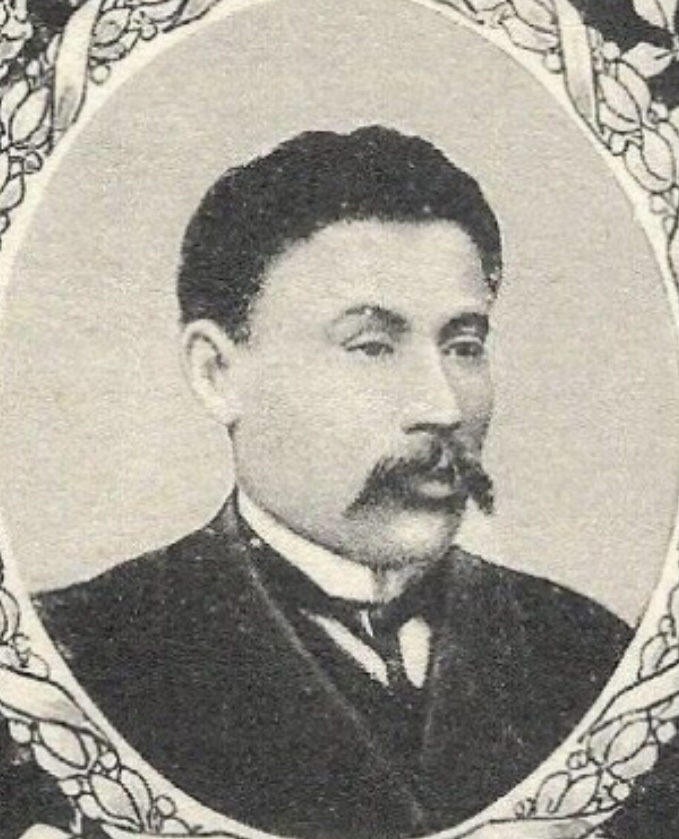
I.M. Weissenberg

I. M. (Isaac Meir) Weissenberg (1878/1881, Żelechów - August 13, 1938, Warsaw) was a Yiddish-language writer in Warsaw, Poland. A disciple of I.L. Peretz, he began writing in 1904 and gained recognition for his 1906 masterpiece "A Shtetl" (A Town). This novella, still regarded as his major achievement, was a literary response to a story by Sholem Asch called "The Shtetl".

Unlike Asch's sentimental view of Eastern European Jewish unity in the waning years of the Russian Empire, Weissenberg used a naturalistic form to explore the deep divides between Jews, usually along class lines. In the process, he "stressed the impact of the new revolutionary doctrines upon the townlets, rousing them from their lethargy and shattering their foundations" (Liptzin, p. 257). (See Shtetl for more on the history of these towns). "Almost alone among Yiddish writers, Weissenberg was a worker and the son of workers," critic Ruth Wisse notes (p. 27), a fact which shaped both his subject matter and his use of language. He wrote several novels and plays, but remained a consistently strong writer of novellas and short stories.

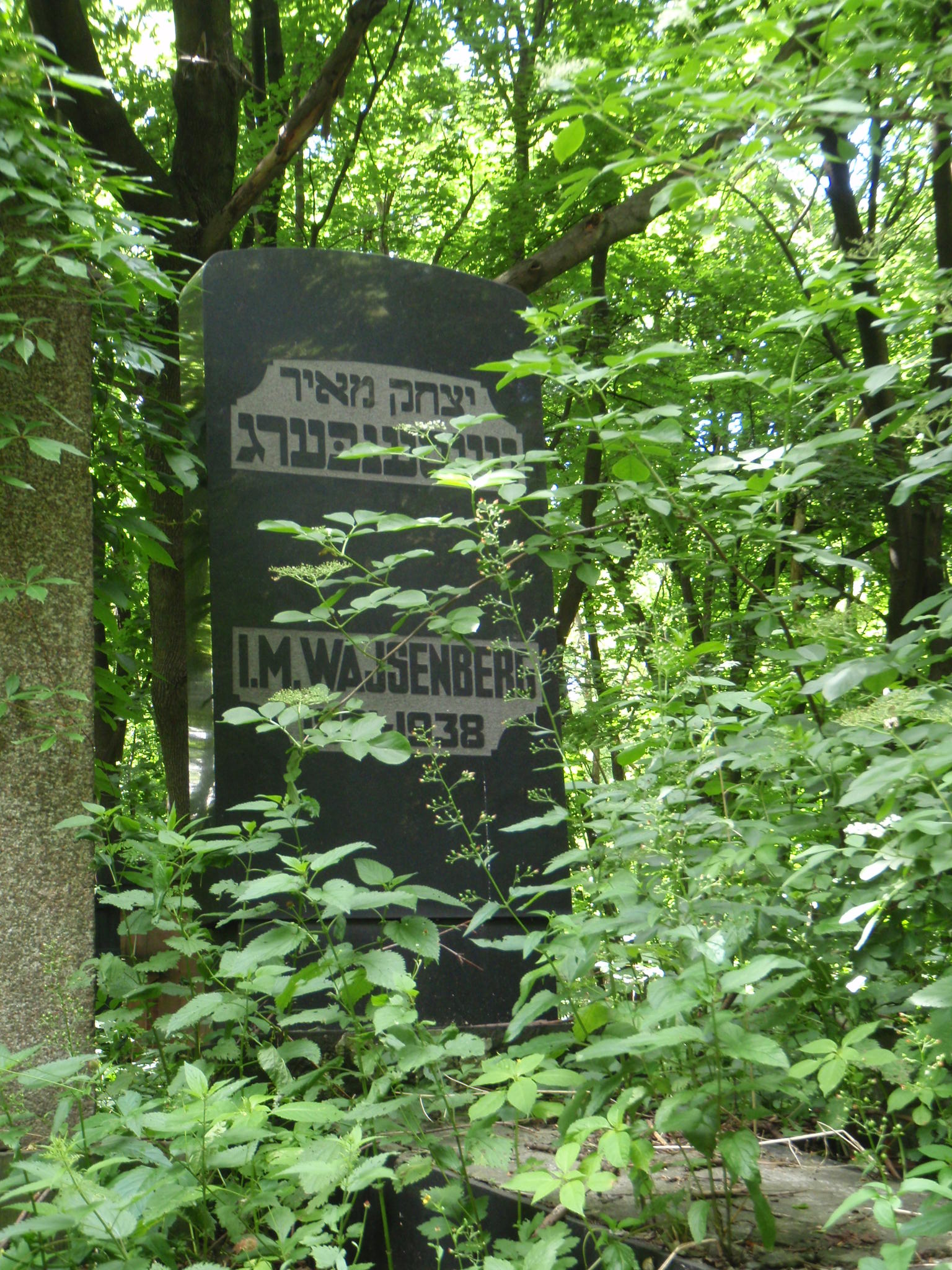
Weissenberg's grave at the Okopowa Street Jewish Cemetery, next to Hersh Dovid Nomberg

After the death of Peretz in 1915, Weissenberg became a major force in Polish Yiddish publishing, taking over Peretz's role as promoter of young talent and editor and publisher of periodicals and books. He expended much of his energy during the 1920s and 1930s in fighting battles within Yiddish-speaking Warsaw, even refusing a literary prize awarded him by the local Jewish community. He was particularly opposed to the dominance of "Litvaks" (Jews of Lithuania and other regions where the same dialect of Yiddish is spoken) in communal and literary life. Part of his opposition to this dominance took the form of his introduction of many local Polish-Yiddish terms in his writing, now considered a particularly attractive feature of his writing, as well as a unique orthography based on Polish-Yiddish pronunciation. His funeral in 1938 attracted thousands of mourners from among his reading public.

Because of the class consciousness which marks Weissenberg's central theme, his work was republished in post-War Communist Poland. A nice edition of his best work, edited by his daughter Pearl Weissenberg, was published in Chicago in 1959. Although various of his stories have been translated for anthologies (see, e.g., the Wisse anthology below), no book-length translation of his work is available in English.
