= Wolica, Bełchatów County =

Wolica
- Village
- Location within Poland
- Coordinates: 51°11′29″N 19°21′11″E
- Country: Poland
- Voivodeship: Łódź
- County: Bełchatów
- Gmina: Kleszczów
- Population: 340

Wolica [vɔˈlit͡sa] is a village in the administrative district of Gmina Kleszczów, within Bełchatów County, Łódź Voivodeship, in central Poland.

In 2005 the village had a population of 340.
