= Pod Lasem, Masovian Voivodeship =

Pod Lasem
- Village
- Location within Poland
- Coordinates: 51°47′38″N 21°50′40″E
- Country: Poland
- Voivodeship: Masovian
- County: Garwolin
- Gmina: Żelechów

Pod Lasem ([ˈpɔt ˈlasɛm]) is a village in the administrative district of Gmina Żelechów, within Garwolin County, Masovian Voivodeship, in east-central Poland.
