= Budki, Garwolin County =

Budki
- Village
- Location within Poland
- Coordinates: 51°46′30″N 21°49′53″E
- Country: Poland
- Voivodeship: Masovian
- County: Garwolin
- Gmina: Żelechów
- Time zone: UTC+1 (CET)
  - Summer (DST): UTC+2 (CEST)

Budki [ˈbutki] is a village in the administrative district of Gmina Żelechów, within Garwolin County, Masovian Voivodeship, in east-central Poland.

Five Polish citizens were murdered by Nazi Germany in the village during World War II.
