= Kalinów, Masovian Voivodeship =

Kalinów
- Village
- Location within Poland
- Coordinates: 51°50′N 21°49′E
- Country: Poland
- Voivodeship: Masovian
- County: Garwolin
- Gmina: Żelechów
- Population: 157

Kalinów [kaˈlinuf] is a village in the administrative district of Gmina Żelechów, within Garwolin County, Masovian Voivodeship, in east-central Poland.
