= Wola Grzymalina =

- Settlement
- Location within Poland
- Coordinates: 51°14′14″N 19°20′12″E
- Country: Poland
- Voivodeship: Łódź
- County: Bełchatów
- Gmina: Kleszczów

Wola Grzymalina [ˈvɔla ɡʐɨmaˈlina] is a settlement in the administrative district of Gmina Kleszczów, within Bełchatów County, Łódź Voivodeship, in central Poland.
