= Kleszczów, Łódź Voivodeship =

Kleszczów
- Village
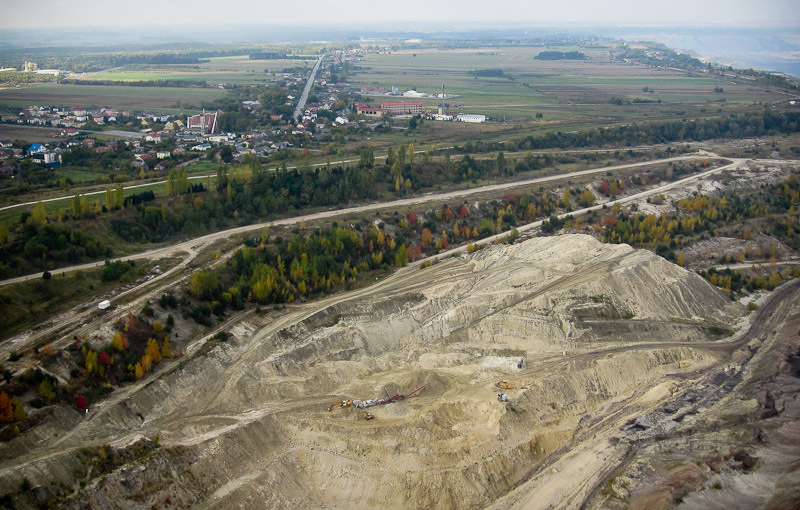
- Aerial view of Kleszczów

- Coat of arms

- Location within Poland
- Coordinates: 51°13′22″N 19°18′15″E
- Country: Poland
- Voivodeship: Łódź
- County: Bełchatów
- Gmina: Kleszczów
- Population (approx.): 4,500
- Website: http://www.kleszczow.pl/

Kleszczów [ˈklɛʂt͡ʂuf] is a village in Bełchatów County, Łódź Voivodeship, in central Poland. It is the seat of the gmina (administrative district) called Gmina Kleszczów.

The commune of Kleszczów is the richest commune in Poland, with a per-capita income of 34,825.79 zł.

== Gallery ==
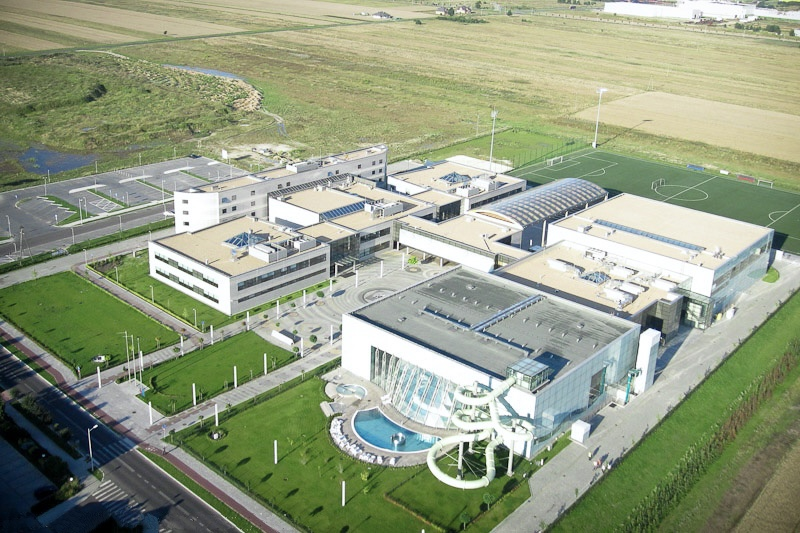
SOLPARK (Aquapark and High school)

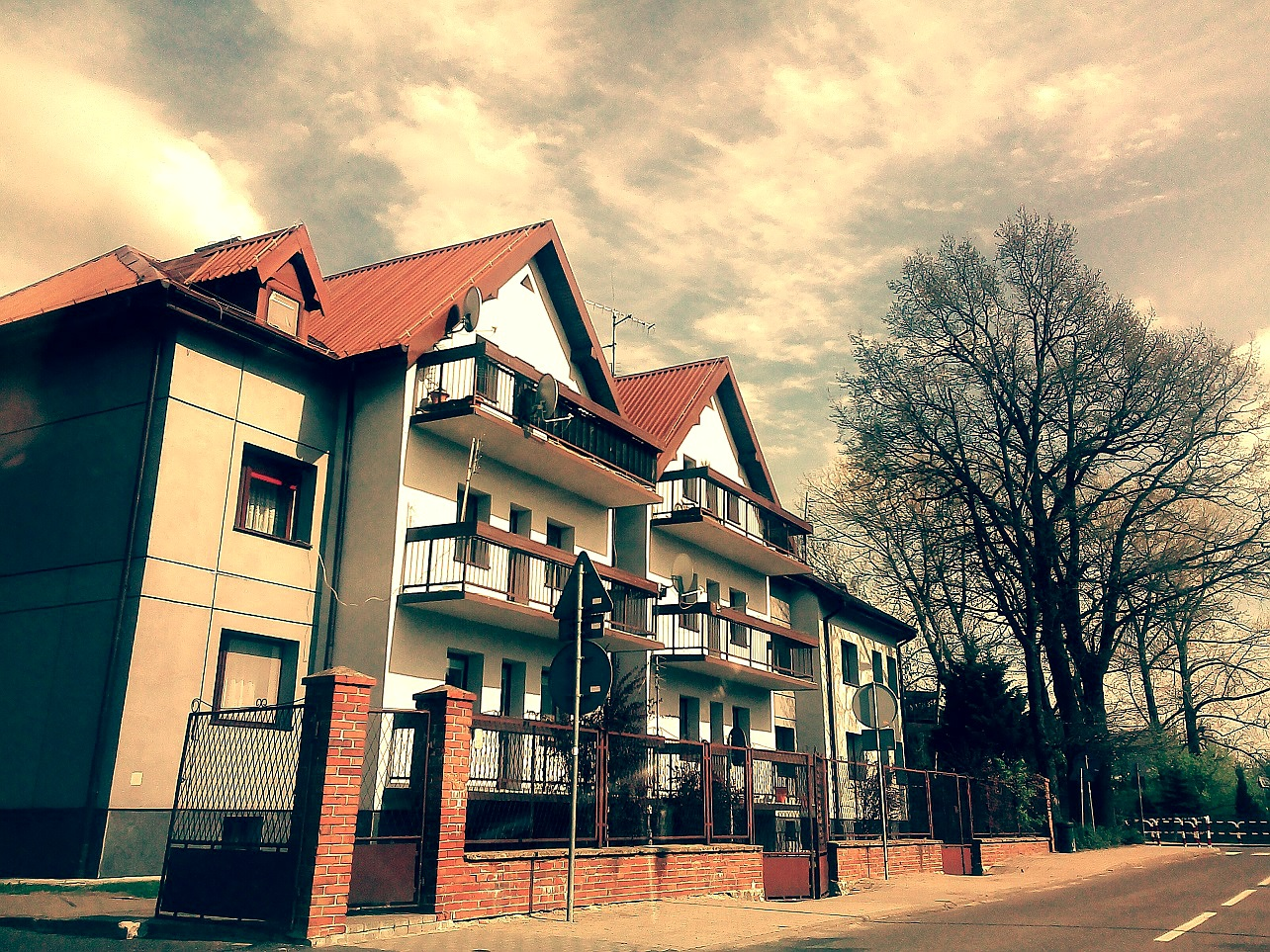
House

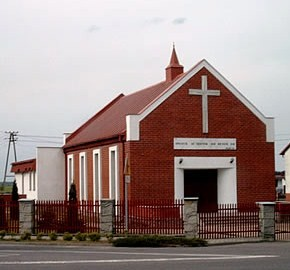
Calvinist Church
