= Dębina, Gmina Kleszczów =

Dębina
- Village
- Location within Poland
- Coordinates: 51°14′34″N 19°11′40″E
- Country: Poland
- Voivodeship: Łódź
- County: Bełchatów
- Gmina: Kleszczów

Dębina [dɛmˈbina] is a village in the administrative district of Gmina Kleszczów, within Bełchatów County, Łódź Voivodeship, in central Poland.
