= Piaski, Gmina Kleszczów =

Piaski
- Village
- Location within Poland
- Coordinates: 51°14′N 19°23′E
- Country: Poland
- Voivodeship: Łódź
- County: Bełchatów
- Gmina: Kleszczów

Piaski (Polish pronunciation: [ˈpjaskʲi]) is a village in the administrative district of Gmina Kleszczów, within Bełchatów County, Łódź Voivodeship, in central Poland.
