= St Stanislaus Church, Żelechów =

Polish church built in 1741

Coordinates: 51°48′10″N 21°54′59″E

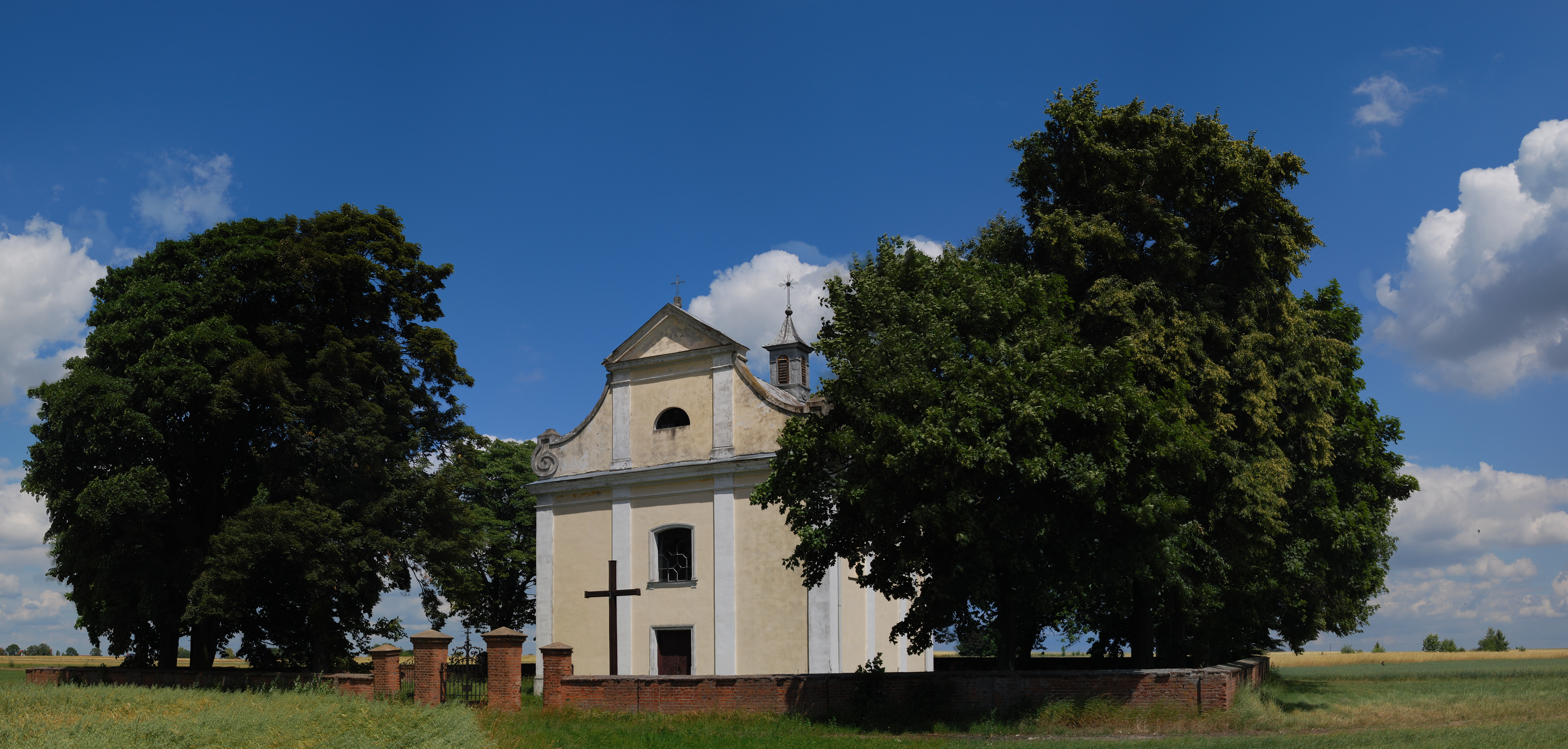
St Stanislaus Church

Saint Stanislaus Church, Żelechów, Poland was built in 1741. It is located outside of the town, in the fields. Before building this Baroque church, a chapel was located there. It is the oldest preserved building in Żelechów.
