= Karolów, Łódź Voivodeship =

Karolów
- Village
- Location within Poland
- Coordinates: 51°15′19″N 19°14′16″E
- Country: Poland
- Voivodeship: Łódź
- County: Bełchatów
- Gmina: Kleszczów

Karolów [kaˈrɔluf] is a village in the administrative district of Gmina Kleszczów, within Bełchatów County, Łódź Voivodeship, in central Poland.
