= Kałuskie =

- Village
- Location within Poland
- Coordinates: 51°46′41″N 21°48′51″E
- Country: Poland
- Voivodeship: Masovian
- County: Garwolin
- Gmina: Żelechów

Kałuskie [kaˈwuskʲɛ] is a village in the administrative district of Gmina Żelechów, within Garwolin County, Masovian Voivodeship, in east-central Poland.
