= Gąsiory, Masovian Voivodeship =

Gąsiory
- Village
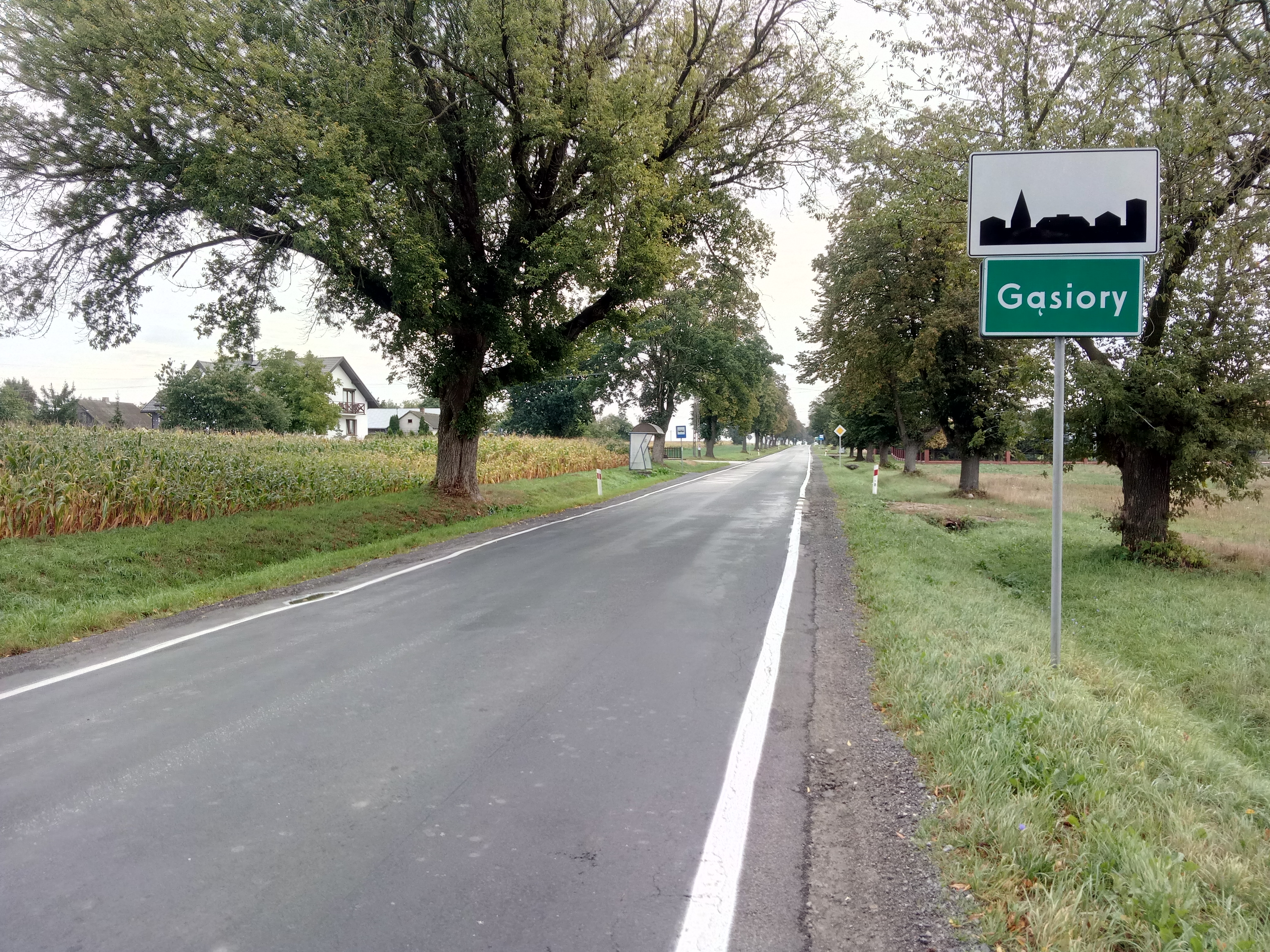

- Location within Poland
- Coordinates: 51°49′N 21°47′E
- Country: Poland
- Voivodeship: Masovian
- County: Garwolin
- Gmina: Żelechów
- Population: 87

Gąsiory [ɡɔ̃ˈɕɔrɨ] is a village in the administrative district of Gmina Żelechów, within Garwolin County, Masovian Voivodeship, in east-central Poland.
