= Łuszczanowice =

- Village
- Location within Poland
- Coordinates: 51°12′7″N 19°18′19″E
- Country: Poland
- Voivodeship: Łódź
- County: Bełchatów
- Gmina: Kleszczów

Łuszczanowice [wuʂt͡ʂanɔˈvit͡sɛ] is a village in the administrative district of Gmina Kleszczów, within Bełchatów County, Łódź Voivodeship, in central Poland.
