= Gmina Kleszczów =

Gmina Kleszczów Kleszczów Commune
- Gmina
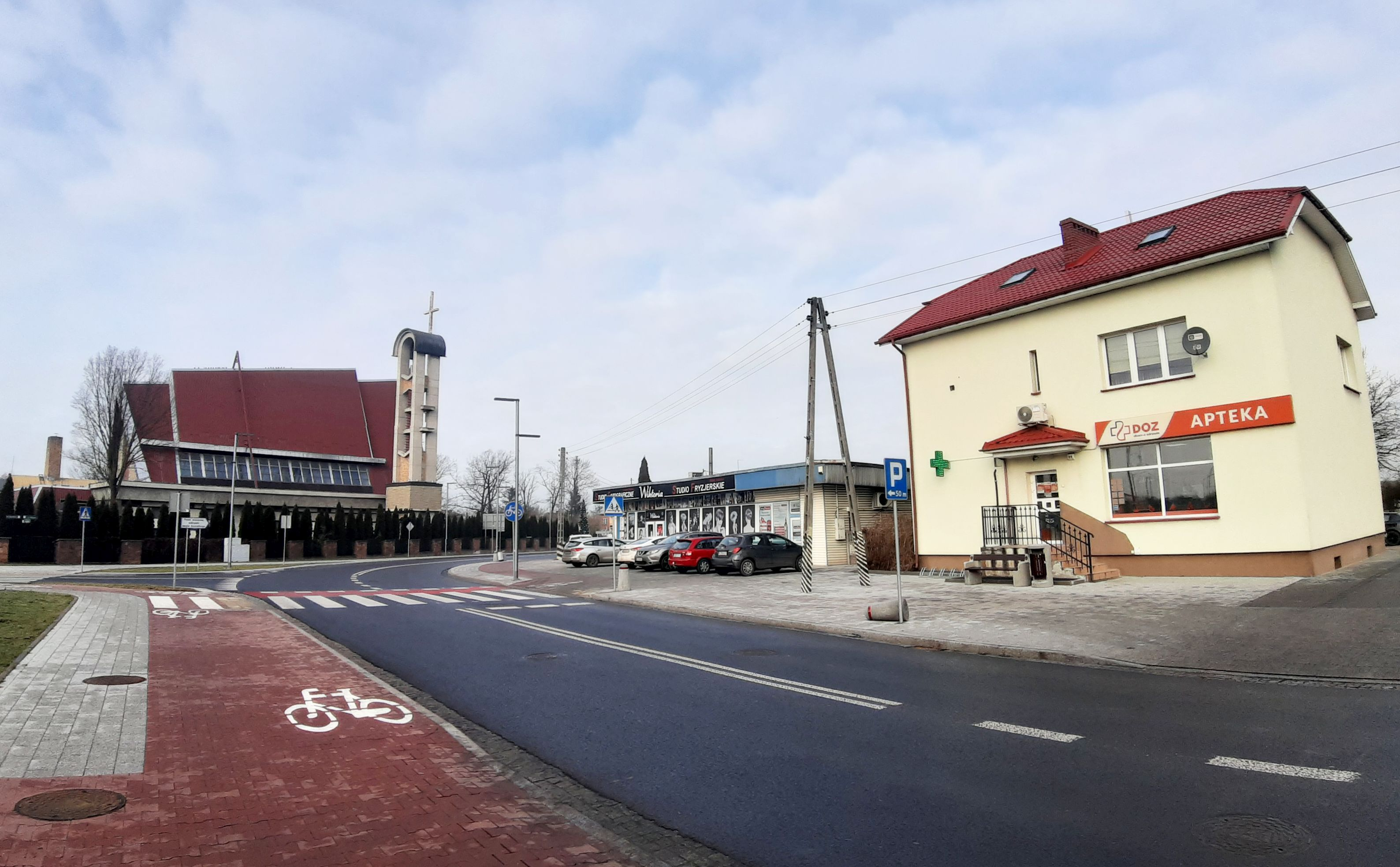

- Flag Coat of arms
- Interactive map of Gmina Kleszczów
- Coordinates (Kleszczów): 51°13′N 19°18′E
- Country: Poland
- Voivodeship: Łódź
- County: Bełchatów
- Seat: Kleszczów

Area
  - Total: 124.82 km^{2} (48.19 sq mi)

Population (2006)
  - Total: 4,158
  - Density: 33.31/km^{2} (86.28/sq mi)
- Time zone: UTC+1 (CET)
  - Summer (DST): UTC+2 (CEST)
- Website: www.kleszczow.pl

Gmina Kleszczów is a rural gmina (administrative district) in Bełchatów County, Łódź Voivodeship, in central Poland. Its seat is the village of Kleszczów, which lies approximately 18 kilometres (11 mi) south of Bełchatów and 64 km (40 mi) south of the regional capital Łódź.

The gmina covers an area of 124.82 square kilometres (48.2 sq mi), and as of 2006 its total population is 4,158.

Kleszczów is the wealthiest gmina in Poland (by income from tax). In relation to the poorest, it has about 100 times more income. The reason is the presence of the "Bełchatów" coal mine (coal is called "black gold" in Poland, being one of the biggest resources) and Bełchatów Power Station. Because of it, where income from the mine and powerhouse gives 160 million zł from taxes, Kleszczów has higher (over a dozen times) tax income per capita than in the state city of Poland - Warsaw about 33560,89 zł per capita, which is also because of low population. Due to its abnormal wealth, the gmina provides free services for inhabitants, such as a swimming pool, meals and holidays for children, better roads and free separate private medical service access, which is unusual in Poland.

== Villages ==
Gmina Kleszczów contains the villages and settlements of:

- Adamów
- Antoniówka
- Biłgoraj
- Bogumiłów
- Czyżów
- Dąbrowa
- Dębina
- Faustynów
- Kamień
- Karolów
- Kleszczów
- Kocielizna
- Kolonia Łuszczanowice
- Łękińsko
- Łuszczanowice
- Piaski
- Rogowiec
- Słok-Młyn
- Stefanowizna
- Wola Grzymalina
- Wolica
- Żłobnica

== Neighbouring gminas ==
Gmina Kleszczów is bordered by the gminas of Bełchatów, Dobryszyce, Kamieńsk, Kluki, Lgota Wielka, Sulmierzyce and Szczerców.
