= Faustynów, Gmina Kleszczów =

Faustynów
- Village
- Location within Poland
- Coordinates: 51°14′6″N 19°13′44″E
- Country: Poland
- Voivodeship: Łódź
- County: Bełchatów
- Gmina: Kleszczów

Faustynów [fausˈtɨnuf] was a village in the administrative district of Gmina Kleszczów, within Bełchatów County, Łódź Voivodeship, in central Poland. Currently the area of Faustynów and a few more former villages are part of the Bełchatów Coal Mine.
