= Adamów, Gmina Kleszczów =

Adamów
- Settlement
- Location within Poland
- Coordinates: 51°12′40″N 19°22′4″E
- Country: Poland
- Voivodeship: Łódź
- County: Bełchatów
- Gmina: Kleszczów

Adamów [aˈdamuf] is a settlement in the administrative district of Gmina Kleszczów, within Bełchatów County, Łódź Voivodeship, in central Poland.
