= Jezioro, Masovian Voivodeship =

Jezioro
- Village
- Location within Poland
- Coordinates: 51°47′5″N 21°50′42″E
- Country: Poland
- Voivodeship: Masovian
- County: Garwolin
- Gmina: Żelechów

Jezioro [jɛˈʑɔrɔ] is a village in the administrative district of Gmina Żelechów, within Garwolin County, Masovian Voivodeship, in east-central Poland.
