= Słok-Młyn =

- Settlement
- Location within Poland
- Coordinates: 51°17′23″N 19°20′52″E
- Country: Poland
- Voivodeship: Łódź
- County: Bełchatów
- Gmina: Kleszczów

Słok-Młyn [ˈswɔk ˈmwɨn] is a settlement in the administrative district of Gmina Kleszczów, within Bełchatów County, Łódź Voivodeship, in central Poland.
