= Ostrożeń Trzeci =

- Village
- Location within Poland
- Coordinates: 51°46′13″N 21°47′30″E
- Country: Poland
- Voivodeship: Masovian
- County: Garwolin
- Gmina: Żelechów

Ostrożeń Trzeci [ɔsˈtrɔʐɛɲ ˈtʂɛt͡ɕi] is a village in the administrative district of Gmina Żelechów, within Garwolin County, Masovian Voivodeship, in east-central Poland.
