= Stefanów, Garwolin County =

Stefanów
- Village
- Location within Poland
- Coordinates: 51°46′43″N 21°48′56″E
- Country: Poland
- Voivodeship: Masovian
- County: Garwolin
- Gmina: Żelechów
- Population: 504

Stefanów [stɛˈfanuf] is a village in the administrative district of Gmina Żelechów, within Garwolin County, Masovian Voivodeship, in east-central Poland.
