= Huta Żelechowska =

- Village
- Location within Poland
- Coordinates: 51°59′40″N 21°55′45″E
- Country: Poland
- Voivodeship: Masovian
- County: Garwolin
- Gmina: Żelechów
- Population: 333

Huta Żelechowska [ˈxuta ʐɛlɛˈxɔfska] is a village in the administrative district of Gmina Żelechów, within Garwolin County, Masovian Voivodeship, in east-central Poland.
