= Goniwilk-Las =

- Village
- Location within Poland
- Coordinates: 51°50′22″N 21°47′34″E
- Country: Poland
- Voivodeship: Masovian
- County: Garwolin
- Gmina: Żelechów

Goniwilk-Las [ɡɔˈnivilk ˈlas] is a village in the administrative district of Gmina Żelechów, within Garwolin County, Masovian Voivodeship, in east-central Poland.
