= Żelechów =

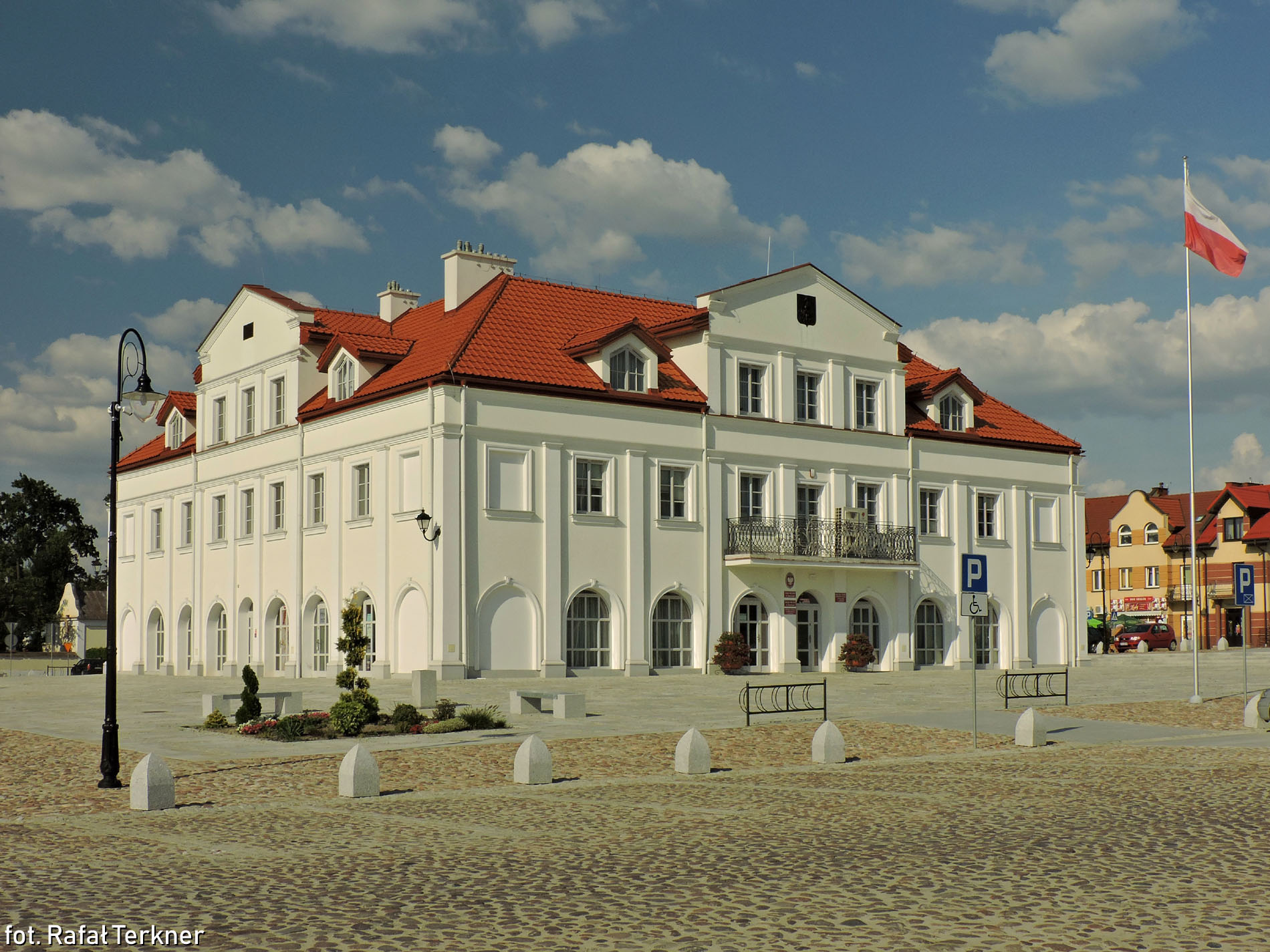
- Żelechów Town Hall

- Coat of arms

- Location within Poland
- Coordinates: 51°48′N 21°54′E
- Country: Poland
- Voivodeship: Masovian
- County: Garwolin
- Gmina: Żelechów
- Established: before 1282
- Town rights: 1447

Government
  - Mayor: Łukasz Bogusz

Area
  - Total: 12.14 km^{2} (4.69 sq mi)
- Elevation: 170 m (560 ft)

Population (2010)
  - Total: 4,134
  - Density: 340.5/km^{2} (882.0/sq mi)
- Time zone: UTC+1 (CET)
  - Summer (DST): UTC+2 (CEST)
- Postal code: 08-430
- Area code: +48 25
- Vehicle registration: WG
- Website: https://www.zelechow.pl/

Żelechów [ʐɛˈlɛxuf] (Yiddish זשעלעכאָוו) is a town in eastern Poland in Masovian Voivodeship in Garwolin County. It is the seat of Gmina Żelechów. Żelechów is 85 kilometres (53 miles) from Warsaw and 85 kilometres (53 miles) far from Lublin. More than 4000 people live in the town. It is a local centre, supporting nearby farmers and housing a few high schools. Żelechów has a recorded history that goes back over 700 years.

== Geography ==
=== Location ===
Żelechów is located near border of Masovian and Lublin Voivodeships. During the period between 1975 and 1998 Żelechów was in Siedlce Voivodship. Before 1795, Żelechów had strong connections with Lesser Poland. So it is located between three geographical regions: Podlaskie, Lubelszczyzna and Masovia.

The surrounding landscape was formed during the ice age when the whole area was covered with ice. The landscape now is gently waved, and the town itself is located on a hill, making its altitude vary from 160 m (524.93 ft) up to 195 m (639.76 ft). The area around Żelechów is surrounded by fields and few forests.

=== Area ===
The area of the town is 1,214 hectares (3,000 acres). This is much more than the actual built-up area: 77.8% (945 ha [2,340 acres]) of the whole area is agriculture usage, 3.6% (43 ha [110 acres]) of the area are forests, and 18.6% (226 ha [560 acres]) is unused or built up.

=== Demography ===
Żelechów is 65th town in Masovian Voivodship in respect of number of inhabitants (with total number of towns in Masovian Voivodship of 85). It is the smallest town in Garwolin County. In 2006 number of inhabitants of the town of Żelechów made 47.7% of the total population of Gmina Żelechów. Detailed demography information from 31 December 2006:

Description	Total		Women		Men	
unit	people	%	people	%	people	%
population	4,028	100	2,065	51.3	1,963	48.7
Density (people/km^{2})	332		170		162	

Poles are dominant nationality in the town, there is also a group of the Romani people.

education data according to the Polish census of 2002
	lack	primary	vocational	secondary	undergraduate	higher
people	146	1 143	796	810	152	271
percent	3.6	28.1	18.9	19.9	3.7	6.7
women	89	600	312	436	107	178
men	57	543	484	374	45	93

Historical population
Year	Pop.	±%
1897	7,140	—
1910	7,771	+8.8%
1921	7,142	−8.1%
1931	8,503	+19.1%
1950	3,851	−54.7%
1960	3,361	−12.7%
2010	4,134	+23.0%

Population pyramid of Żelechów according to the data from 2005.

Chart showing population changes since 1995.

== Name ==
The name was used in the time of Middle Ages. It can be found in a document (written in time between 1335 and 1342) as Zelechov. In a later document written by Jan Długosz (1470–1480) as Zyelyechow. The name derives from the Polish forename Żelech [ˈʐɛlɛx], which is a simplified form of Żelisław.

Jews used to call it Zshelikhov and it was incorporated as such in the Jewish history after Jewish scholars found a religious meaning to its name. In Hebrew, the name זליחוב translates as זה לי חוב, which means "it is my obligation" [to be a Jew and engage in mitzvot and good deeds].

Names in other languages:

- Russian: Желехув
- Hebrew: ז'לחוב, ז'ליחוב
- Yidish: זשעלעכאָוו, זשעליכאָוו

== History ==
The first record of Żelechów dates back to 1282, and the city rights were gained in 1447. Żelechów was a private town, first owned by the family of Ciołek, who later changed their surname to Żelechowski after the town. It was administratively located in the Radom County, and then the Stężyca County, in the Sandomierz Voivodeship in the Lesser Poland Province. King Casimir IV Jagiellon established annual fairs and weekly markets in 1447. In 1516, at the request of the heir of Żelechów, King Sigismund I the Old changed the dates of fairs and market days, and established a second annual fair. It was a local center of trade and an important city until the Deluge (Swedish invasion). At that time the town was greatly devastated, and dozens of people died (also due to diseases). In the first half of the 17th century Jews first settled in Żelechów. The owners of the town changed frequently, one of them was Ignacy Wyssogota Zakrzewski, the first President of Warsaw.

After the Third Partition of Poland in 1795, Żelechów belonged to Austria. After the Polish victory in the Austro-Polish War of 1809, it became part of the short-lived Duchy of Warsaw, and after the duchy's dissolution at the Congress of Vienna, it was placed in Congress Poland, which was in fact controlled by Russia. The town saw an influx of Jews as a result of Russian discriminatory policies (see Pale of Settlement). Joachim Lelewel was a deputy to the Sejm from Żelechów county in years 1828–1831. Romuald Traugutt lived here in 1845, he served as officer of a ruff of sappers. During the January Uprising near Żelechów, few skirmishes took place.

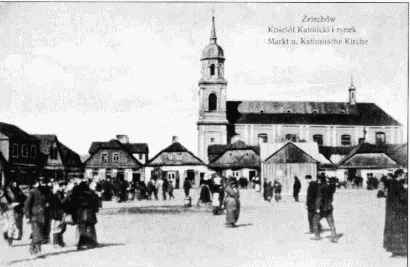
Market Square (Rynek) in 1916

After the uprising the Russian government took the decision to punish those who fought against them, who were generally nobility. Nearby peasants received land (which later belonged to nobility), and the city from that time onward was not owned by a single person. To keep the peace in the area, two cavalry companies and an artillery unit were placed in Żelechów. They brought prosperity, because their needs had to be supported by the townspeople. In that time, Żelechów started to be especially well known as a shoe production center.

In 1880 a great fire burned a large part of the town, but it was rebuilt quickly with brick houses replacing wooden ones. According to the 1921 census, the town had a population of 7,142, of which 43.8% declared Polish nationality and 56.2% declared Jewish nationality. During the interwar period about 800 firms resided in Żelechów (mainly shops and handicrafts). Before the Great Wars, many Jews migrated to America, mainly to Costa Rica, where they founded a new Jewish community.

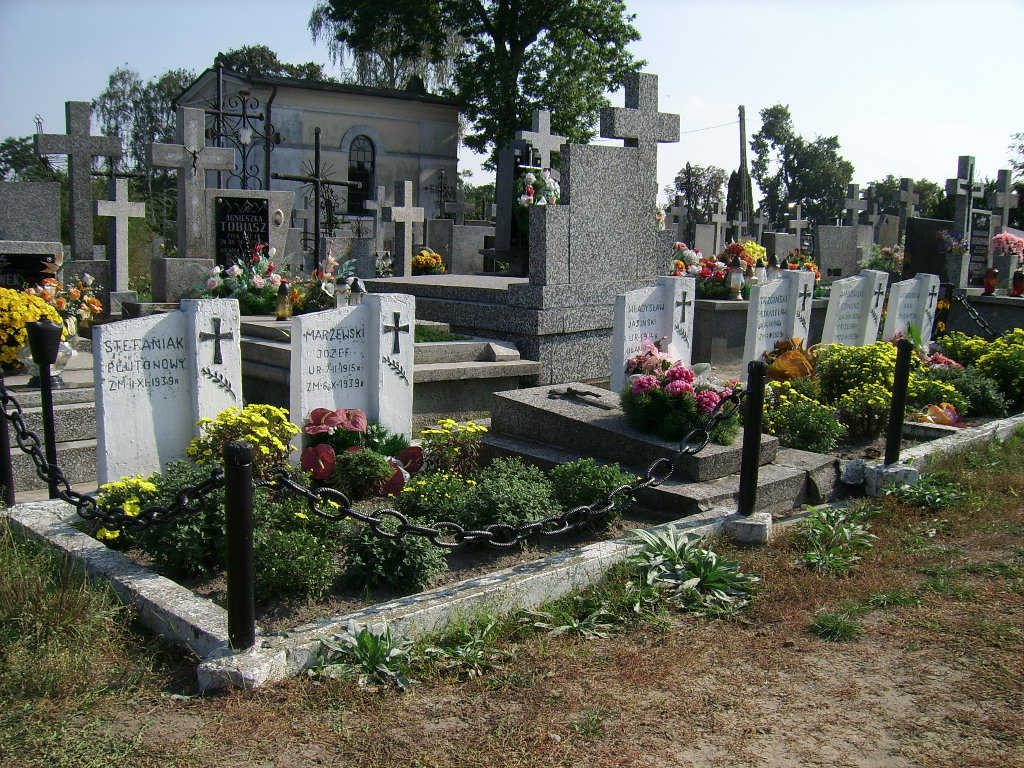
Graves of Polish soldiers killed during the German invasion of Poland in 1939

Following the German-Soviet invasion of Poland, which started World War II in September 1939, the town was occupied by Germany until 1944. Nazi Germany established a ghetto in a small area in the city, placing about 10,000 Jews there, mainly from Żelechów but also from other cities of Poland. In September 1942, the liquidation of the ghetto began, where people were transported to Treblinka extermination camp, but due to the chaos many tried to escape. About 1,000 died in Żelechów this time shot by German soldiers.

On 17 July 1944 the Red Army entered Żelechów, ending the war there. Only 50 Jews remained alive in the city. At this time about 4,000 people lived in Żelechów, and this number has not changed much.

== Historic buildings ==
Historic churches

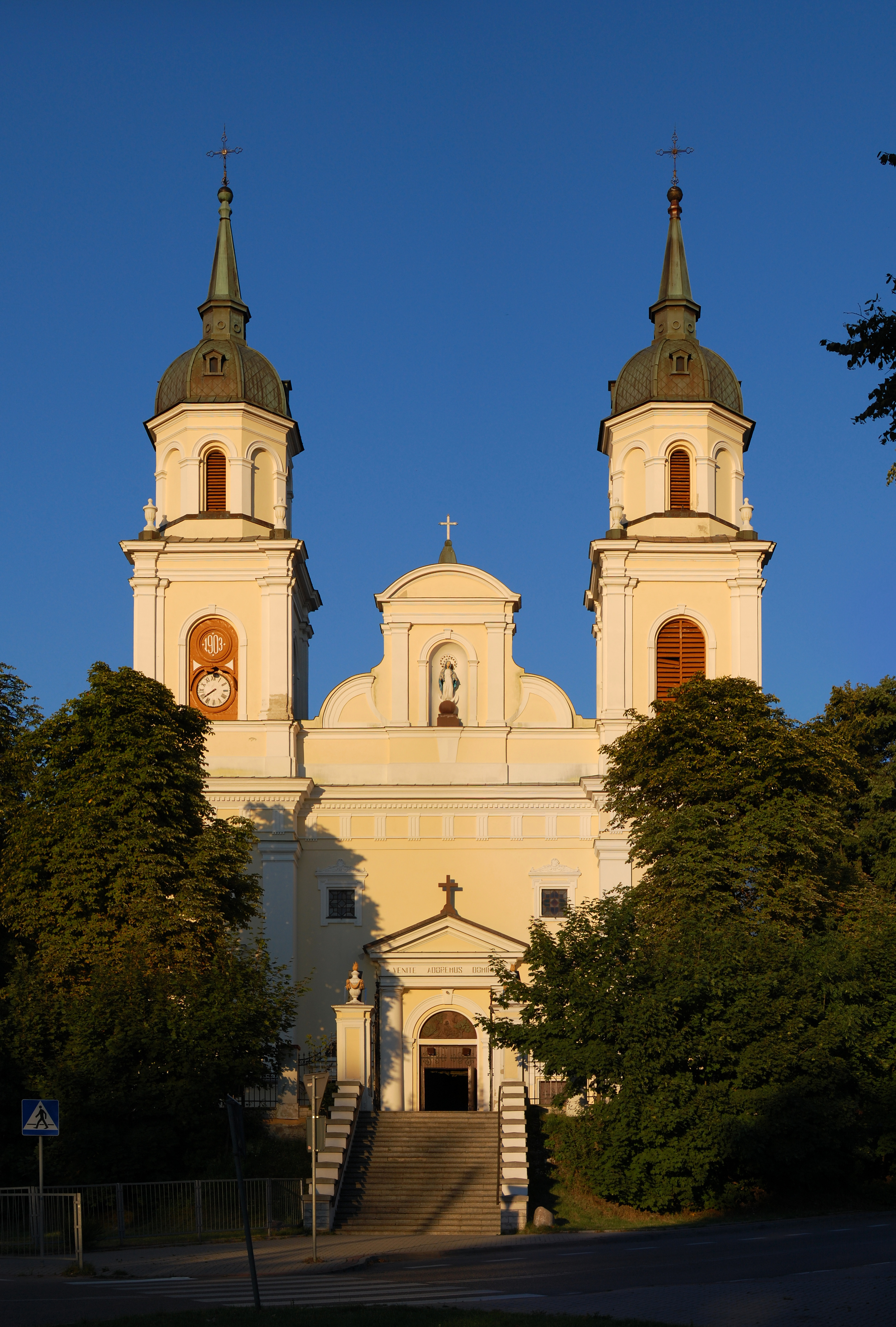
Church of the Assumption

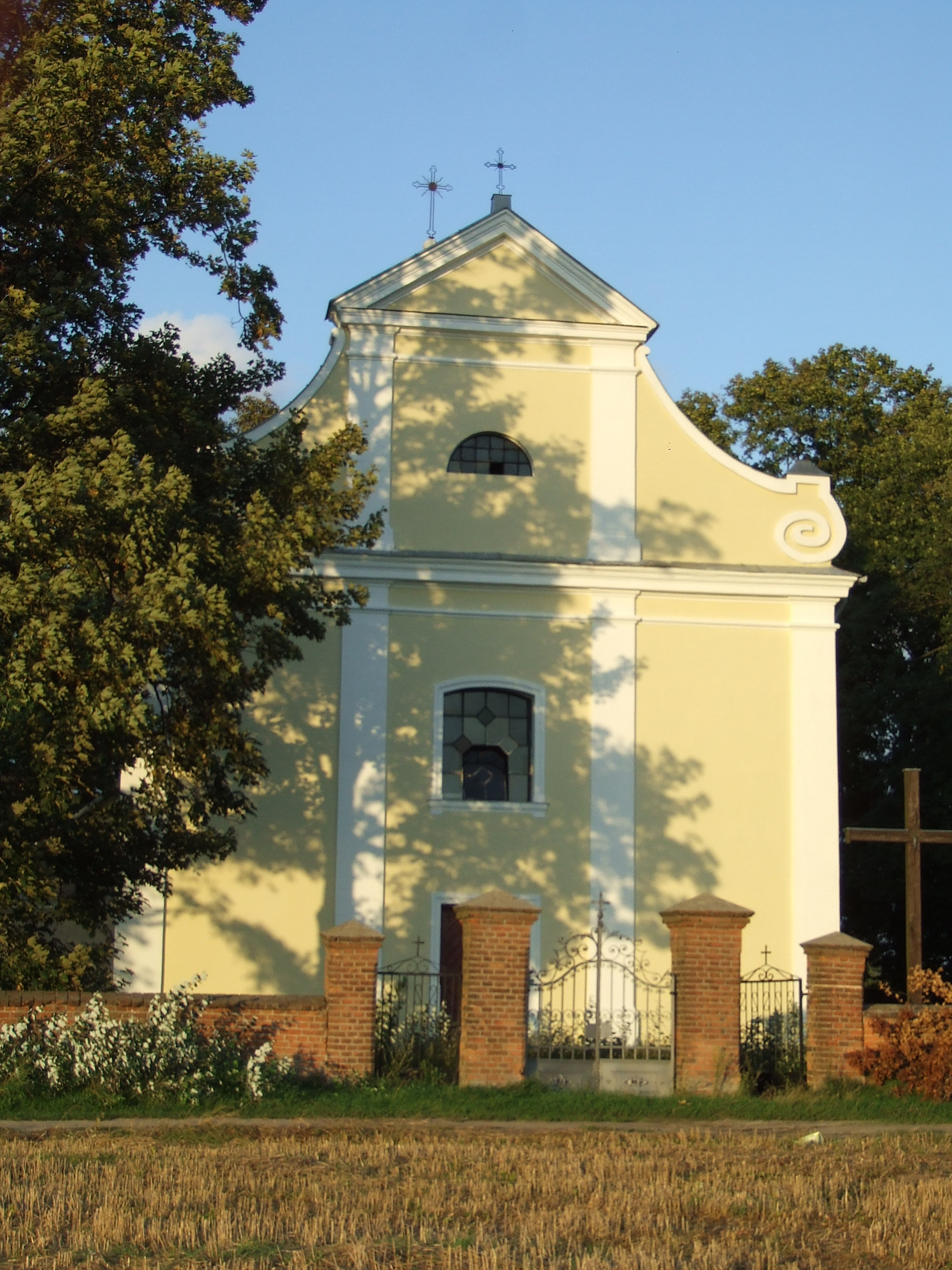
Saint Stanislaus Church

- Neo-baroque Parish church. Construction begun in 1692 and ended in 1728. In 1894 full rebuild took place. The church is located in place where a wooden church stands, built before 1326.
- Baroque St Stanislaus church built in 1741. It is the oldest building in Żelechów preserved in the same state as it was built.
- Classical palace, construction begun in 1726 and ended lastly in 1838.
- Town hall built in eighteenth century located in the center of the Market Square.
- Market Square (Rynek) – one of the biggest market squares in Europe (46th position on 23 February 2007) with area of 12,996 m^{2} (139,887.78 sq ft). Rynek was built in the end of the 18th century on the order of Ignacy Wyssogota Zakrzewski.
- Tomb of Ordęga family in the cemetery built in 1852. There are also some headstones from nineteenth century.
- Jewish cemetery containing few headstones.
- Many wooden houses built in nineteenth century.

== Economy ==
Żelechów is a centre supporting nearby farmers. There are over 500 firms in the town, mainly small family shops, handicrafts or service. Bigger firms work in the fields of machinery, footwear and the floor industry.

== Education ==
Żelechów is a local centre of education, up to secondary school. There are many schools offering education in different areas of knowledge.

== Transport ==
Żelechów lies along vovoideship road 807 which connects it to Maciejowice to the south-west and to Łuków to the east.

The nearest railway station is in Łuków.

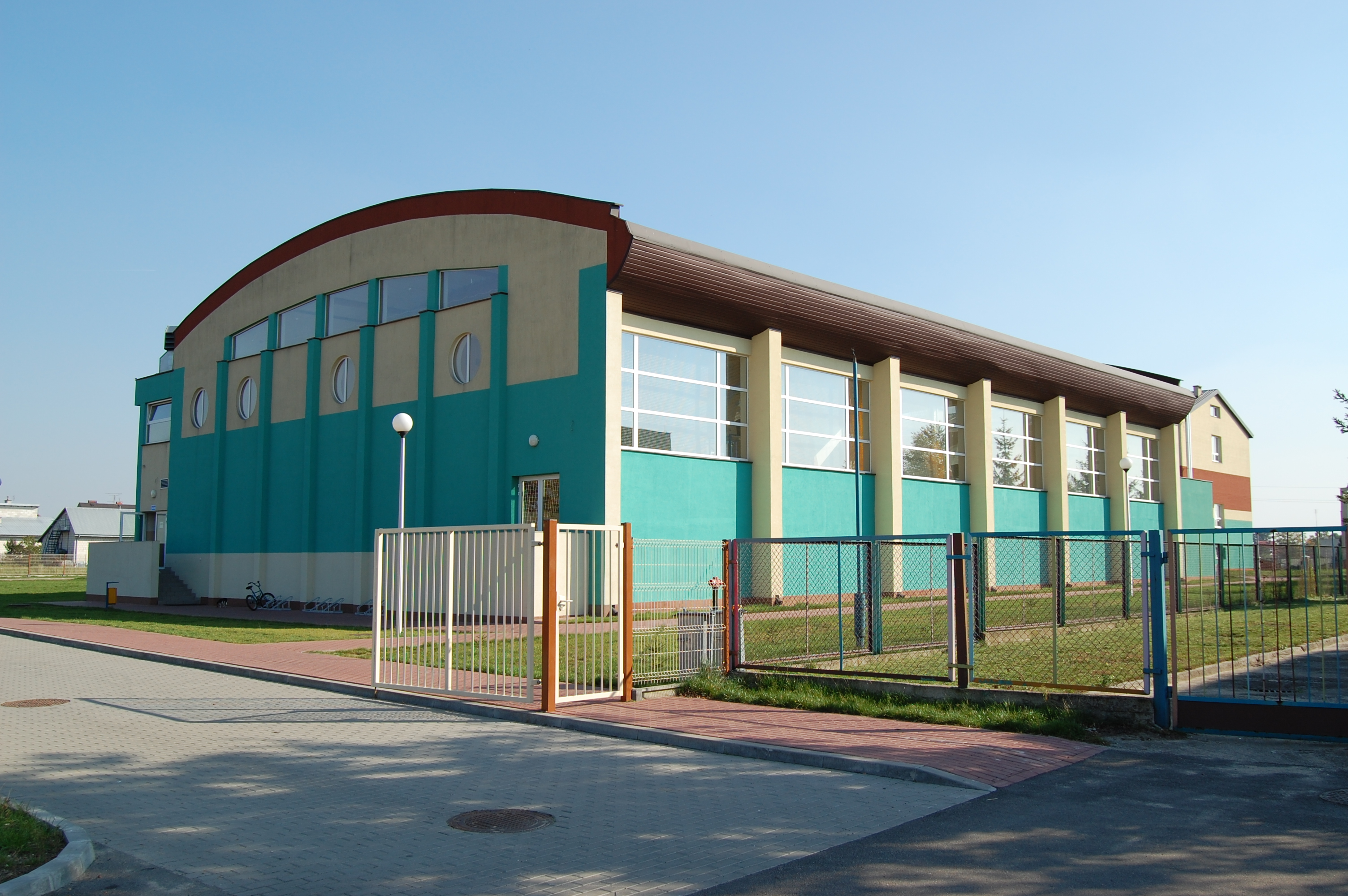
Sports hall

== Sport ==
Local football club Sęp Żelechów was founded in 1921. The club competes at regional league level (Masovian regional league, Siedlce).

== Famous persons ==
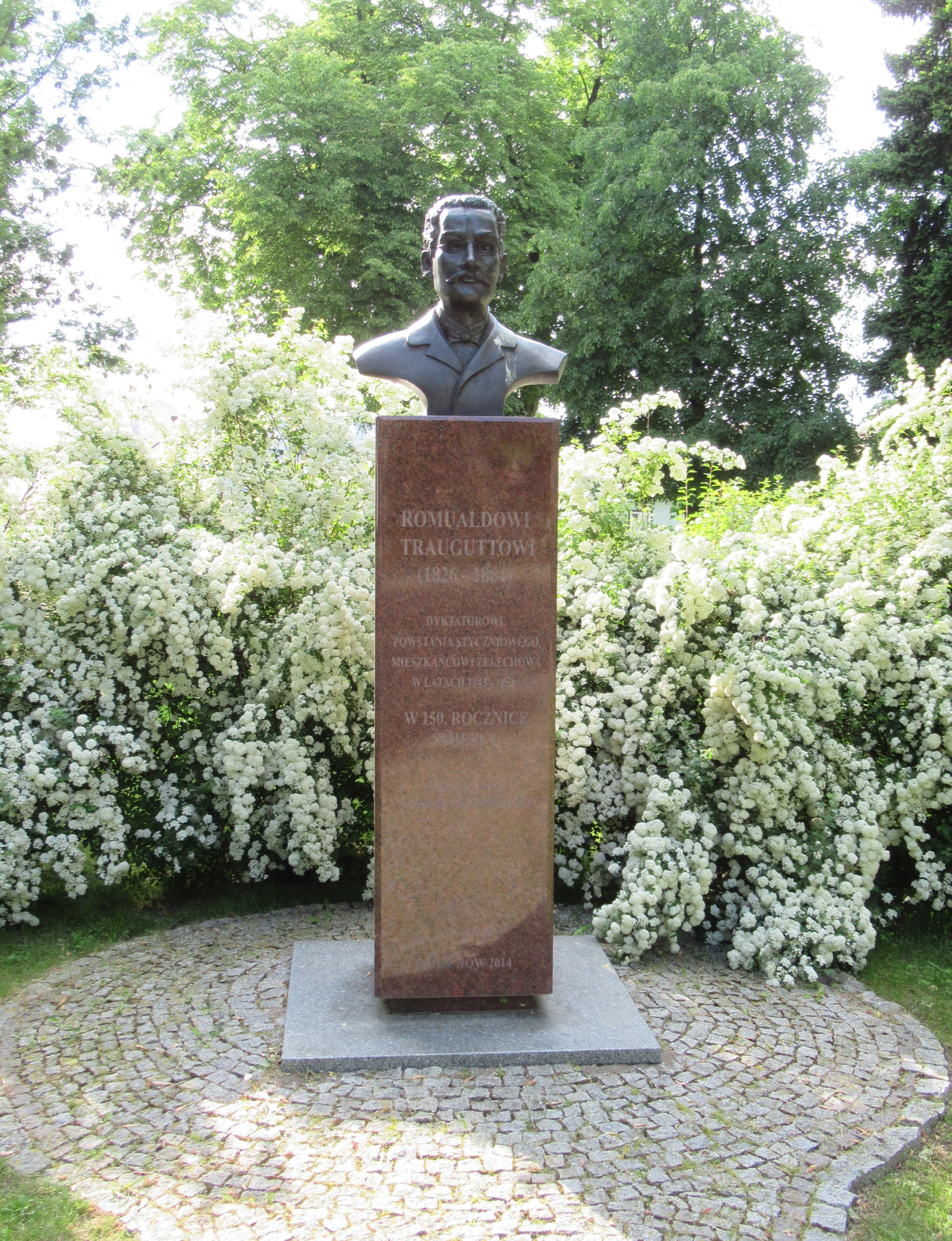
Romuald Traugutt Monument

- Wacław Rzewuski – owner of Żelechów, the branch church was built on his order.
- Levi Yitzchok of Berditchev – rabbi and Hasidic leader, who lived in Żelechów for 10 years.
- Ignacy Wyssogota Zakrzewski – owner of Żelechów. Zakrzewski was the first President of Warsaw. He is buried in Żelechów cemetery.
- Joachim Lelewel – politician, deputy to Sejm from Żelechów county.
- Isaac Meir Weissenberg – Yiddish-language writer born in Żelechów.
- Romuald Traugutt – Polish general and war hero, who lived in Żelechów.
- Shalom Zisman – Israeli politician born in Żelechów.
- Janusz Józefowicz – Polish actor and director, who comes from Żelechów.
