= Józefów, Gmina Żelechów =

Józefów
- Village
- Location within Poland
- Coordinates: 51°46′24″N 21°48′1″E
- Country: Poland
- Voivodeship: Masovian
- County: Garwolin
- Gmina: Żelechów

Józefów (Polish pronunciation: [juˈzɛfuf]) is a village in the administrative district of Gmina Żelechów, within Garwolin County, Masovian Voivodeship, in east-central Poland.
