= Kamień, Bełchatów County =

Kamień
- Village
- Location within Poland
- Coordinates: 51°15′15″N 19°12′46″E
- Country: Poland
- Voivodeship: Łódź
- County: Bełchatów
- Gmina: Kleszczów
- Population: 160

Kamień (Polish pronunciation: [ˈkamjɛj̃]) is a village in the administrative district of Gmina Kleszczów, within Bełchatów County, Łódź Voivodeship, in central Poland.
