= Stary Kębłów =

- Village
- Location within Poland
- Coordinates: 51°47′38″N 21°51′47″E
- Country: Poland
- Voivodeship: Masovian
- County: Garwolin
- Gmina: Żelechów
- Population: 228

Stary Kębłów [ˈstarɨ ˈkɛmbwuf] is a village in the administrative district of Gmina Żelechów, within Garwolin County, Masovian Voivodeship, in east-central Poland.
