= Antonówka, Masovian Voivodeship =

Antonówka
- Village
- Location within Poland
- Coordinates: 51°48′11″N 21°57′3″E
- Country: Poland
- Voivodeship: Masovian
- County: Garwolin
- Gmina: Żelechów

Antonówka [antɔˈnufka] is a village in the administrative district of Gmina Żelechów, within Garwolin County, Masovian Voivodeship, in east-central Poland.
