= Podwierzbie, Gmina Żelechów =

Podwierzbie
- Village
- Location within Poland
- Coordinates: 51°47′27″N 21°50′2″E
- Country: Poland
- Voivodeship: Masovian
- County: Garwolin
- Gmina: Żelechów

Podwierzbie [pɔdˈvjɛʐbjɛ] is a village in the administrative district of Gmina Żelechów, within Garwolin County, Masovian Voivodeship, in east-central Poland.
