= Antoniówka, Bełchatów County =

Antoniówka
- Village
- Location within Poland
- Coordinates: 51°12′22″N 19°15′13″E
- Country: Poland
- Voivodeship: Łódź
- County: Bełchatów
- Gmina: Kleszczów

Antoniówka [antɔˈɲufka] is a village in the administrative district of Gmina Kleszczów, within Bełchatów County, Łódź Voivodeship, in central Poland.
