= Michalin (Gąsiory) =

- Village
- Location within Poland
- Coordinates: 51°47′31″N 21°46′38″E
- Country: Poland
- Voivodeship: Masovian
- County: Garwolin
- Gmina: Żelechów

Michalin [miˈxalin] is a village in the administrative district of Gmina Żelechów, within Garwolin County, Masovian Voivodeship, in east-central Poland.
