= Kotłówka, Masovian Voivodeship =

Kotłówka
- Village
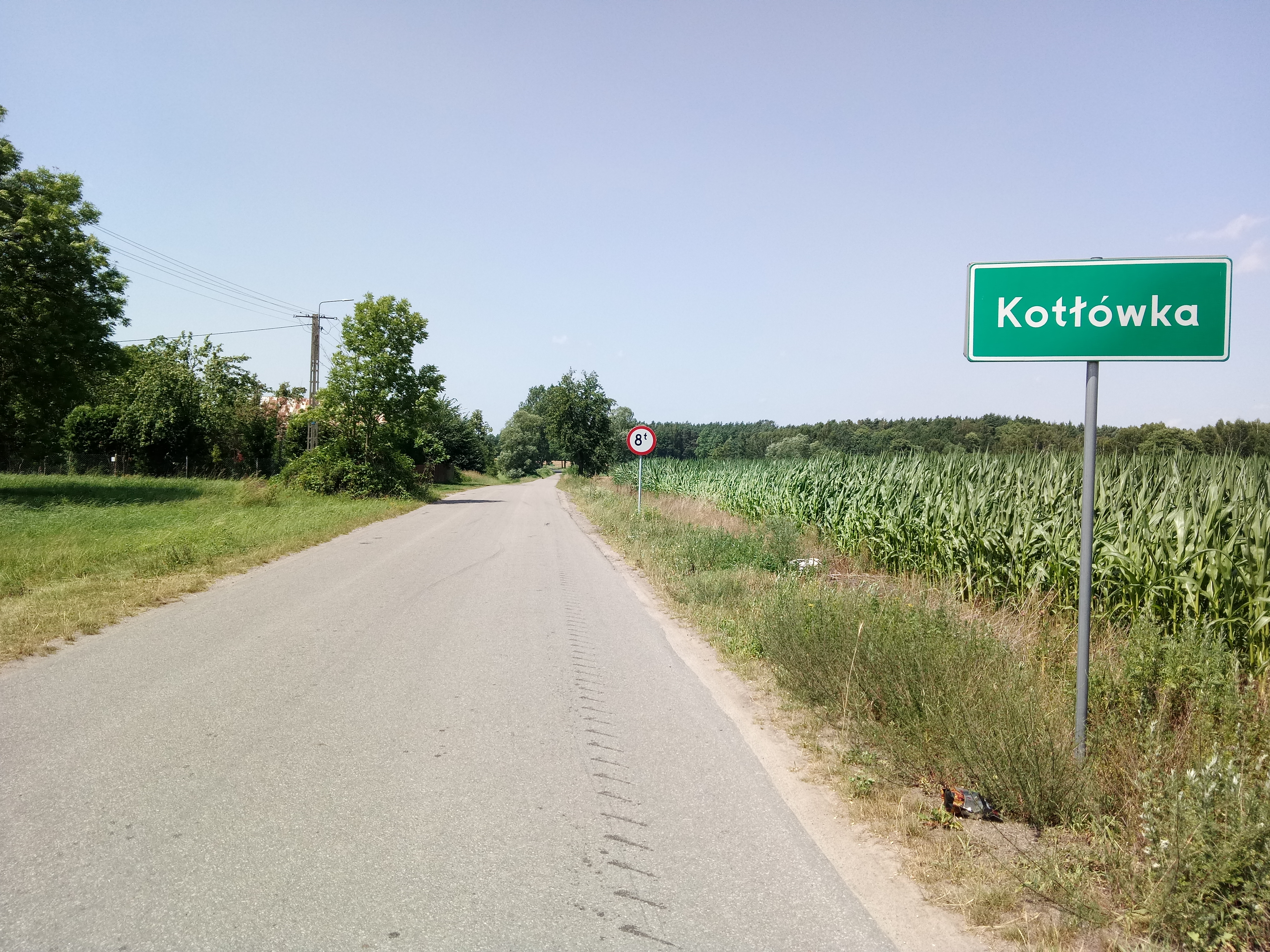

- Location within Poland
- Coordinates: 51°47′54″N 21°56′15″E
- Country: Poland
- Voivodeship: Masovian
- County: Garwolin
- Gmina: Żelechów

Population
  - Total: 225
- Time zone: UTC+1 (CET)
  - Summer (DST): UTC+2 (CEST)

Kotłówka [kɔˈtwufka] is a village in the administrative district of Gmina Żelechów, within Garwolin County, Masovian Voivodeship, in east-central Poland.

Eight Polish citizens were murdered by Nazi Germany in the village during World War II.
