= Bogumiłów, Bełchatów County =

Bogumiłów
- Village
- Location within Poland
- Coordinates: 51°15′54″N 19°13′21″E
- Country: Poland
- Voivodeship: Łódź
- County: Bełchatów
- Gmina: Kleszczów

Bogumiłów [bɔɡuˈmiwuf] is a village in the administrative district of Gmina Kleszczów, within Bełchatów County, Łódź Voivodeship, in central Poland.
