= Łuzki, Łosice County =

Łuzki
- Village
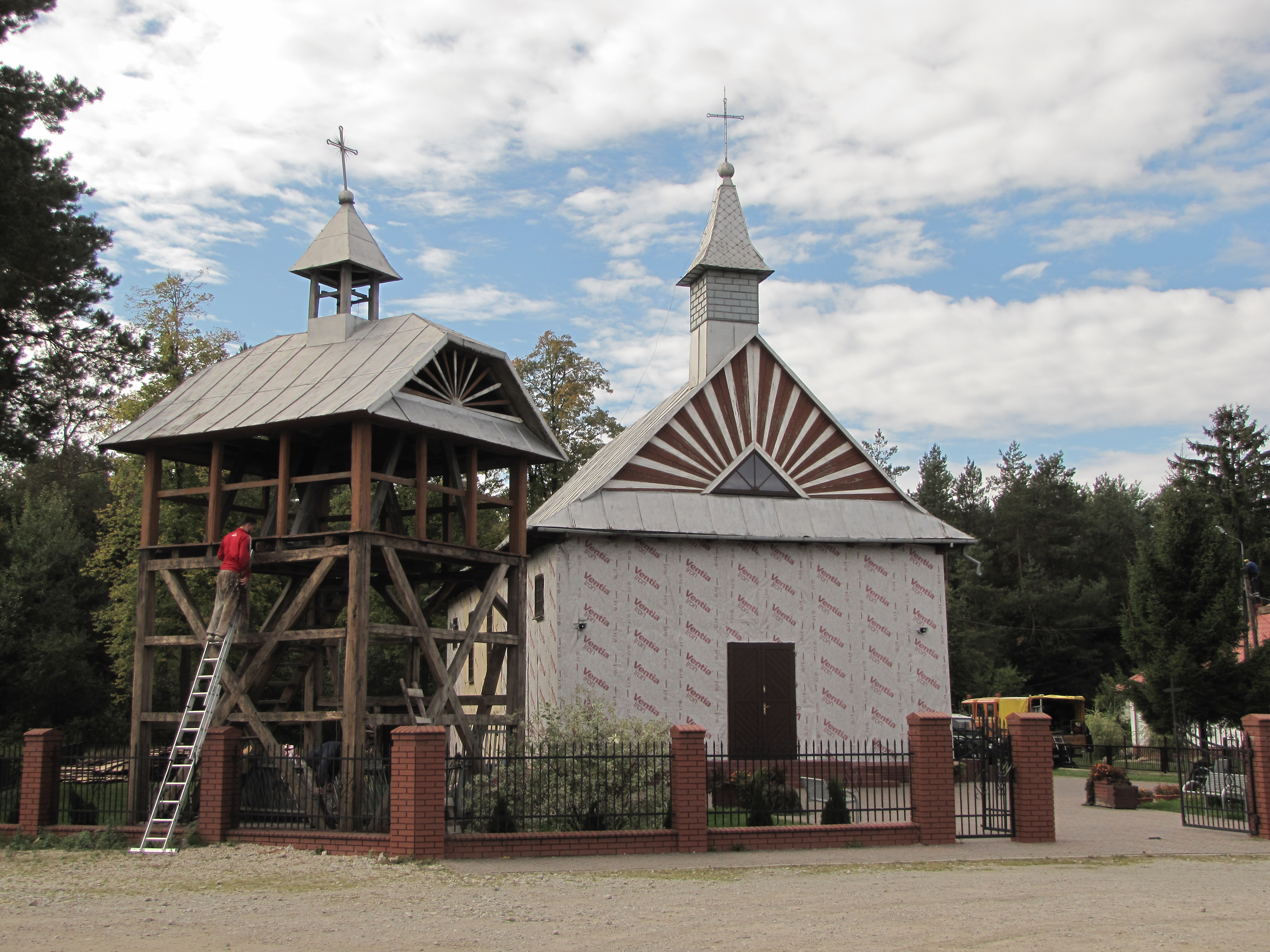
- Church of the Maternity of the Blessed Virgin Mary

- Location within Poland
- Coordinates: 52°11′17″N 22°48′53″E
- Country: Poland
- Voivodeship: Masovian
- County: Łosice
- Gmina: Łosice

Population
  - Total: 230

Łuzki [ˈwuski] is a village in the administrative district of Gmina Łosice, within Łosice County, Masovian Voivodeship, in east-central Poland.
