= Łoje =

Łoje may refer to the following places:

- Łoje, Kozienice County in Masovian Voivodeship (east-central Poland)
- Łoje, Przasnysz County in Masovian Voivodeship (east-central Poland)
- Łoje, Ełk County in Warmian-Masurian Voivodeship (north Poland)
- Łoje, Gołdap County in Warmian-Masurian Voivodeship (north Poland)

== See also ==
- Łoje-Awissa
- Łojew
- Łojewo (disambiguation)
