= Zofia Garlińska-Hansen =

Polish architect

Zofia Aleksandra Garlińska-Hansen (13 May 1924 - 24 January 2013) was a Polish architect and co-author of the Open Form Theory (1957) as well as the Linear Continuous System (1967) with her husband, Oskar Nikolai Hansen. Zofia and Oskar worked together, producing architectural theory and built works primarily through the 1950’s and 1960’s.

== Early life ==
Zofia Garlińska-Hansen was born 13 May 1924 in Kałuszyn, Poland. Little is known of her family, other than that her father, Tadeusz Garliński, was a schoolteacher. She studied at the Faculty of Architecture of the Warsaw University of Technology under the proponent of modernism Romauld Gutt. She met her future husband and co-designer Oskar Hansen while at university, who was also studying architecture at the time. They married in 1950 and she graduated in 1952.

== Theory ==
=== Open Form Theory ===
Zofia is the co-author of Open Form Theory with Oskar, the most important school of thought in Polish Modernist architecture. This theory acts in a response to what is described as "Closed Form"; that being the predetermined, unchanging perception of architecture in relation to those who live within that architecture. It grew from the theory in sculpture put forth by Polish Constructivist Katarzyna Kobro and Władysław Strzemiński, who described space as being shaped by human activities and "by leaving a margin for evoking one's latent essence". They desired for architecture to create a backdrop for the mundane and everyday of people, rather than simply project the static will of the architect.

=== Linear Continuous System ===
Anticipating a population surge in Poland, the Hansen's expanded upon their theory of Open Form to the scale of urban planning, which was integrated with notions of adaptability and flexibility. Disregarding existing infrastructural methods as outdated, they proposed the Linear Continuous System (LCS), which organized the designs of cities linearly. They imagined a system of large cities which stretched across Poland from North to South in four parallel bands, in an effort to dissolve the idea of a city centre and surrounding periphery. The ideas behind LCS were applied in two of their projects, the Juliusz Słowacki housing estate in Lublin and the Przyczółek Grochowski 'The Grochów Bridgehead' in Warsaw. This proved to be her most controversial completed project, which consisted of a series of buildings that housing 6,600 inhabitants. Interviewed in 1990 while at the housing project, Garińska-Hansen critiqued her own work, expressing disappointment by confessing that "I think that in a practical sense, Przyczółek Grochowski is not a success, because people are not happy there."

== Career ==
Zofia and Oskar's built work focused on the rebuilding of Poland following World War II through several social housing projects, primarily in Warsaw. These include:

- The Juliusz Słowacki housing estate in Lublin (1961)
- Rakowiec (1961-1963)
- Bracławska (1964-1974)
- Przyczółek Grochowski 'The Grochów Bridgehead' (1968-1974)

Zofia was also a co-head exhibition designer at the National Exhibition of Interior Design at Zachęta Gallery in 1957, which interrogated the shaping of interior spaces.

=== House in Szumin ===
A small, gabled summer house near an oxbow lake in the Mazovia region of Poland, the House in Szumin is the spatial manifesto of Open Form. It was initially constructed in 1968-70 but perpetually changed based on the habits and needs of those residing within it. This project was freed from the constraints of the Polish social housing industry and therefore allowed this site to more holistically reflect Zofia and Oskar's ideas about Open Form. The interior of the House in Szumin was transformable, used to serve domestic functions but also as a teaching space, containing didactic tools which the Hansen's used while teaching composition classes. It had also housed a steel structure which was exhibited at the 1977 Venice Biennale.

=== Unbuilt work ===
Several projects of theirs which were never realised include the following:

- Warsaw Town Tall (1952)
- Extension to the Zachęta Gallery in Warsaw (with Lech Tomaszewski and Stanisław Zamecznik; 1958)
- "The Road" monument to the victims of the concentration camp in Auschwitz (1958)
- the museum of contemporary art in Skopje (1966)

== Death and legacy ==
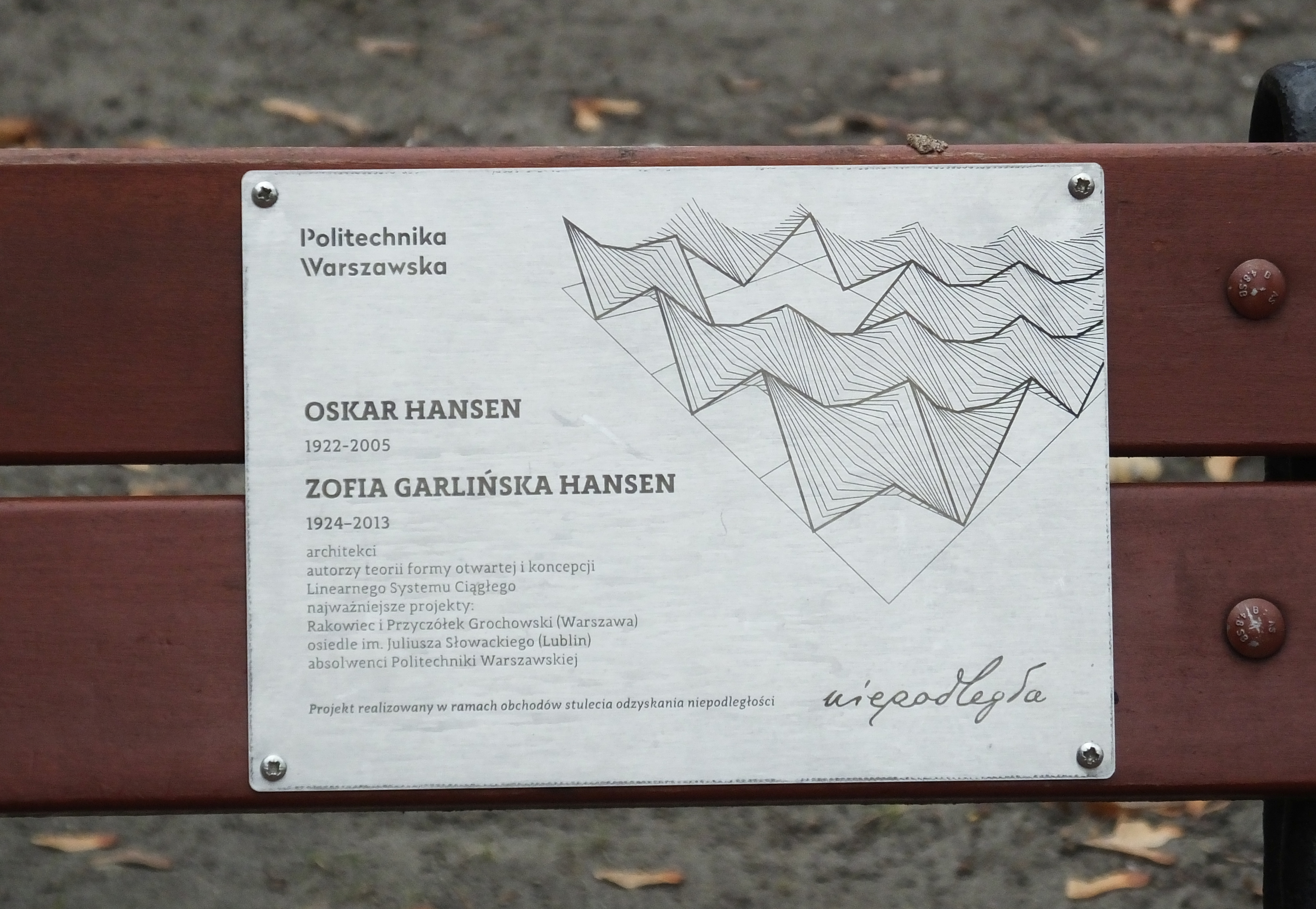
Commemorative plaque celebrating Zofia and Oskar placed on bench in the main courtyard of the Warsaw University of Technology.

Little has been written about Garińska-Hansen following her most active years in the 1960’s. Zofia Garińska-Hansen died 24 January 2013 in Warsaw at the age of 89, buried in the Powązki Military Cemetery, Poland. That same year, Filip Springer published a biographical report Zaczyn: about Zofia and Oskar Hansen about the duo. In 2014, their House in Szumin came into the custody of the Museum of Modern Art in Warsaw, Poland. A conservation strategy was developed to preserve both the idea and the physical aspect of the site. It has also been included on the worldwide Iconic Houses Network list, and is the only Polish edifice on the list.

Although the husband-and-wife duo of Oskar and Zofia worked in tandem for the vast majority of their professional careers, critics and journalists frequently ascribe their achievements solely to Oskar. She was associated with the Warsaw Residential Cooperative like her husband Oskar but she is "typically remained in her husband's shadow..." Springer, the journalist and photographer who worked on the Hansen's biography, also stated that Oskar "frequently emphasized that Zofia was an outstanding architect in her own right. In their relationship, she never played the second fiddle."

== See also ==
- Polish architecture
- List of women architects
- Modernist architecture
