= Stanisław Sędziak =

Polish army officer and partisan leader (1913–1978)

Stanisław Jerzy Sędziak
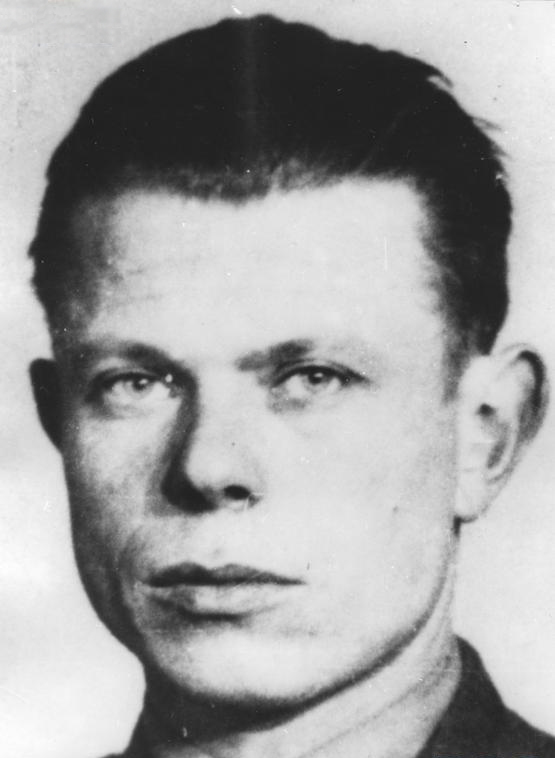
- Nicknames: "Warta", "Wola", "Oset", "Wojna", "S-2", "T", "Stanisław Sędziszewski", "Zaremba", "Kulesza", "Czesław Noakowski"
- Born: 7 September 1913; Gwizdały, Poland
- Died: 2 August 1978 (aged 64) Toruń, Poland
- Allegiance: Poland
- Rank: Colonel

Stanisław Jerzy Sędziak, noms de guerre "Warta", "Wola", "Oset", "Wojna", "S-2", "T", "Stanisław Sędziszewski", "Zaremba", "Kulesza", "Czesław Noakowski" (born on September 7, 1913, in Gwizdały, died August 2, 1978, in Toruń) – a certified lieutenant colonel of the Polish Army, participant in the defensive war of Poland in 1939, cichociemny; 1942–1944 chief of staff of the Home Army Nowogródek District, in 1944 acting commander of the district, deputy and then chief of staff of the Białystok Citizens' Home Army District, Delegate of the Armed Forces for the Białystok District, in the years 1945–1947 deputy president of the WiN Central Area Management.

== Youth ==
Stanisław Sędziak was the son of Antoni (a steelworker and property manager) and Maria Wolińska.

He attended secondary schools in Grodno and Białystok, and then in the Cadet Corps No. 3 in Rawicz, where in 1934 he obtained his secondary school-leaving examination certificate. In 1936 he graduated from the Infantry Cadet School in Ostrów Mazowiecka and was promoted to the rank of second lieutenant. He was assigned to the 7th Legions' Infantry Regiment in Chełm as a platoon commander.

== September campaign ==
During the September campaign, he was the commander of the 8th company of the 95th Infantry Regiment. He participated in the battles in the region of Puławy and Kazimierz Dolny and in the second battle of Tomaszów. After the capitulation, he stayed in Chełm and Sierpc. In December 1939, he made an attempt to get to Hungary. He was arrested in Tarnów, but managed to escape the same day. He crossed the Polish-Slovak border on the night of December 17–18, 1939. Then he made his way to Hungary and Yugoslavia, from where he travelled by sea to France.

== Polish Armed Forces ==
He arrived in France on February 7, 1940. He joined the Polish army and was assigned to the Infantry Training Center at Camp de Coëtquidan. After the surrender of France, he went to Great Britain. First, he served as the commander of the training battalion in Biggar, and then became a platoon commander in the newly created 1st Rifle Brigade of Polish Armed Forces in the West. He held this position until December 1940, and from January 1941 he was assigned to the 1st War Course at the Higher Military School. After completing this course, he was awarded the title of a certified officer.

On December 16, 1941, he volunteered to work in the country. He received sabotage training and was sworn in at Division VI of the Supreme Commander's Staff. He was transferred to the country as part of the IX team (operation "Rheumatism"). The first, unsuccessful flight of this team took place on the night of September 1–2, and the second one – on the night of September 3–4, 1942. Paratroopers were picked up by the "Ugór" facility near Łyszkowice.

== Nowogródek District of the Home Army ==
After a period of acclimatization, in October 1942 he was appointed the chief of staff of the Home Army's Nowogródek District. He arrived in the Nowogródek Region in December 1942. He dealt with the reorganization of the local network of the district, the improvement of the activities of the staff, preparations and then the coordination of partisan activities.

He ceased to perform the function of the chief of staff on June 25, 1944, when organizational and personnel changes in the district were carried out in preparation for the operation Ostra Brama. Sędziak did not take part in the fights for Vilnius. The 77th Infantry Regiment's 2nd and 7th Battalions, where he was together with the former District commander, Janusz Prawdzic-Szlaski, missed the designated positions.

However, on the orders of Aleksander Krzyżanowski "Wilk", the commander of the combined forces of the Vilnius and Nowogródek Districts, they took part in the concentration in Turgeliai, which took place after the end of the fighting. Sędziak, like most officers of the Nowogródek District, did not participate in the briefing in Bogusze and thus avoided arrest by the NKVD.

On July 19, 1944, in the Rūdninkai Forest, Janusz Prawdzic-Szlaski handed over to him the command of the District (formally a Sub-District). On August 5, 1944, he himself handed over this function to Lt. Maciej Kalenkiewicz "Kotwicz", who also decided to continue guerrilla and underground activities in the eastern territories. Appointed by Kalenkiewicz as his successor, after his death, he again took over the position of the commander of the Nowogródek Sub-District (August 21, 1944). On August 29, he was officially appointed commander-in-chief via a telegram of the Home Army Headquarters.

== Independence underground 1944–1947 ==
In February 1945, he became the deputy chief of staff of the Białystok AK District, commanded by Maj. dipl. Wincenty Ściegienny "Las". He supervised the fighting forces of the District (from January 1945 under the name Armia Krajowa Obywatelska – Citizens' Home Army), he was also responsible for publications. On March 2, 1945, r. he became, after arresting of Maj. Ściegienny, chief of staff, and in early August took the function of Delegate of the Armed Forces of the Country – thus taking over the command of the District (after the arrest of the current commander). In October 1945, he handed over this function to Lt. Col. Michał Świtalski "Juhas", while he himself was appointed second deputy president of the Central Area of the Freedom and Independence association for military affairs. From December 22 until his arrest (January 4, 1947), he was the deputy president of the WiN Central Area.

During the investigation conducted by Jerzy Kaskiewicz, Edward Zając and Adam Adamuszko, he was held in the Mokotów Prison in Warsaw. He was tried on December 3–27, 1947, together with activists of the Underground Committee of the Underground Polish Organization "Stocznia". He was sentenced to death, which, under the amnesty of February 22, 1947, was commuted to life imprisonment.

He was imprisoned successively in Wronki, Rawicz and Strzelce Opolskie. Under the amnesty of April 27, 1956, the Military Garrison Court in Warsaw, on May 7, 1956, lightened his sentence to 12 years in prison. On April 24, 1957, the Council of State, using the right of grace, suspended the remainder of his sentence for two years. He was released on April 29, 1957.

== After 1957 ==
In 1957, he married Wanda Mizgier, with whom he had three children: Andrzej (1958), Sławomir (1961) and Zofia (1965). In the years 1957–1971 he worked at the United Economic Zakłady INCO (belonging to the PAX Association), including the positions of a packaging recovery inspector, a packaging control inspector, a senior technical information inspector, and a salesman at the Sales Office. On March 12, 1971, he was transferred to a disability pension.

He died on August 2, 1978, in Toruń.

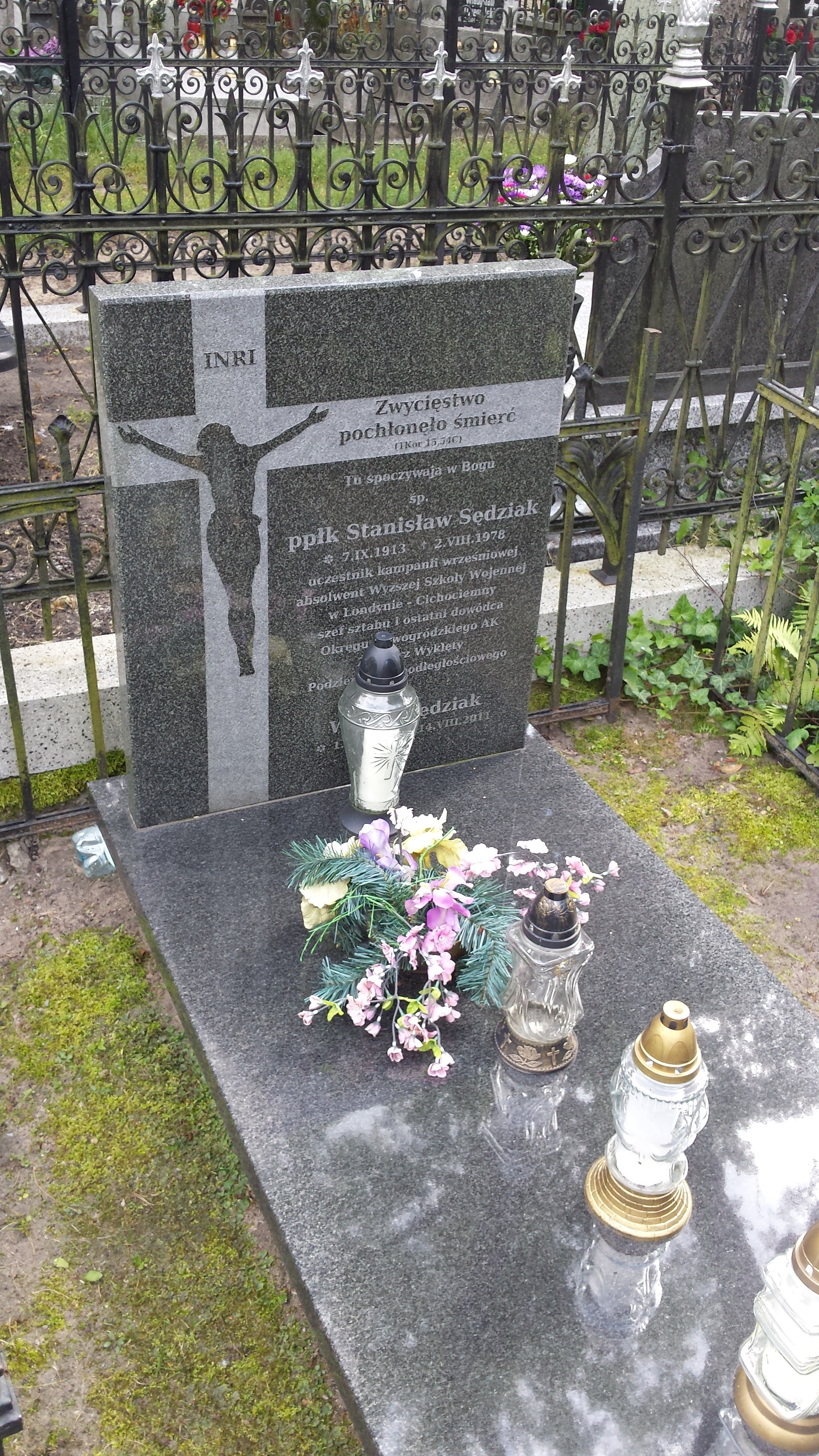
The grave of Stanisław Sędziak at the cemetery of St. George in Toruń

== Orders and decorations ==
- Silver Cross of the War Order of Virtuti Militari – September 28, 1944; No. 13338
- Cross of Valor (twice) – June 26, 1944

== Promotion ==
- second lieutenant – 1936
- lieutenant – 1941
- captain – 1942
- mjr.svg major
- lieutenant colonel – 1945

== Publications ==
- Stanisław Sędziak, Nowogródzka konspiracja, [w:] Ze wspomnień żołnierzy AK Okręgu Nowogródek, opr. Eugeniusz Wawrzyniak, Warszawa 1988.

== Commemoration ==
By Decision No. 29 / MON of February 28, 2020, the 14th West Pomeranian Territorial Defense Brigade was named after Lt. dipl. Stanisław Jerzy Sędziak pseud. Warta, and will celebrate its annual feast on September 4.

== Bibliography ==
- Jan Erdman, Droga do Ostrej Bramy, Warszawa 1990.
- Kazimierz Krajewski, Armia Krajowa na ziemi nowogródzkiej, [w:] Armia Krajowa. Rozwój organizacyjny, red. Krzysztof Komorowski, Warszawa 1996.
- Kazimierz Krajewski, Na Ziemi Nowogródzkiej. "Nów" – Nowogródzki Okręg Armii Krajowej, Warszawa 1997.
- Kazimierz Ratyński, Okręg ZWZ-AK "Nów". Wybrane zagadnienia, Bydgoszcz 2000.
- Ze wspomnień żołnierzy AK Okręgu Nowogródek, oprac. Eugeniusz Wawrzyniak, Warszawa 1988.
- Krzysztof A. Tochman, Słownik biograficzny cichociemnych, Rzeszów 1996, s. 162–164.
