= Kamionna, Węgrów County =

Kamionna
- Village
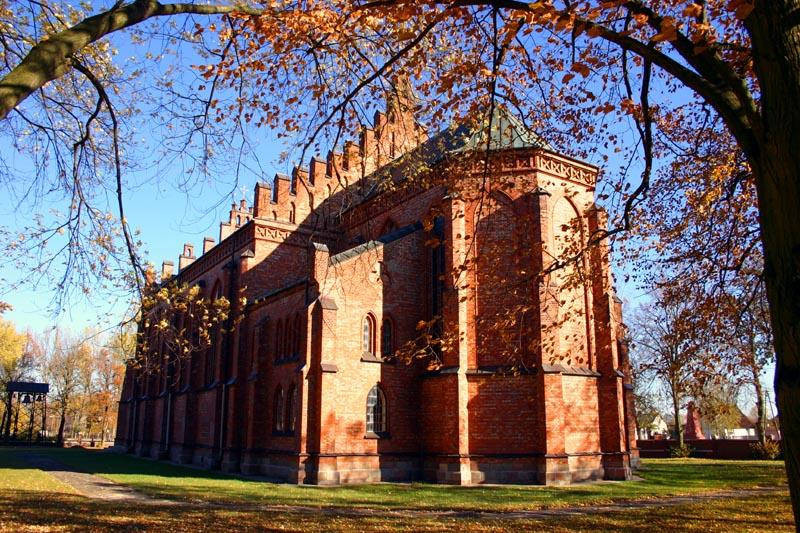
- Immaculate Conception church in Kamionna

- Location within Poland
- Coordinates: 52°30′56″N 21°46′11″E
- Country: Poland
- Voivodeship: Masovian
- County: Węgrów
- Gmina: Łochów
- Founded: 15th century
- Population: 306
- Time zone: UTC+1 (CET)
  - Summer (DST): UTC+2 (CEST)
- Postal code: 07-130
- Area code: +48 25
- ISO 3166 code: POL
- Vehicle registration: WWE

Kamionna [kaˈmjɔnna] is a village in the administrative district of Gmina Łochów, within Węgrów County, Masovian Voivodeship, in east-central Poland.

== History ==
The village was founded in the 15th century. It was initially named Kamienmost, then Kamionolas from 1509, and Kamionna from the 18th century. It was a private village of Polish nobility, including the Targowski/Łochowski, Godlewski, and Kuszell families. In the 1480s, nobleman Mikołaj Targowski founded the local Catholic church and parish of the Immaculate Conception of Mary. A second church of the Ten Thousand Martyrs was founded in 1576 by Jan Łochowski, but it was destroyed by the invading Swedes in 1704. Afterwards, in the same year, Stanisław Godlewski founded a new church in the village.

Kamionna was annexed by Austria in the Third Partition of Poland in 1795. It was regained by Poles following the Austro-Polish War of 1809, and included within the short-lived Duchy of Warsaw. After its dissolution, in 1815, the village fell to the Russian Partition of Poland. During the January Uprising of 1863–1864, local parish priest Józef Wiktor gave shelter to Polish insurgents from the region in Kamionna. During World War I, in 1915, the Russians blew up two church towers and destroyed a part of the church of the Immaculate Conception.

After World War I, in 1918, Poland regained independence and control of the village. Michał Woźniak, the local parish priest who initiated the reconstruction of the church façade after the war, moved to Kutno in 1923, where he was arrested by the Germans during World War II and sent to the Dachau concentration camp, where he was tortured and died in 1942. He is considered one of the 108 Blessed Polish Martyrs of World War II by the Catholic Church.

In 2011, footballer Lukas Podolski and Monika Puchalski had a church wedding in Kamionna.
