= Gmina Łochów =

Gmina Łochów Łochów Commune
- Gmina
- Flag Coat of arms
- Interactive map of Gmina Łochów
- Coordinates (Łochów): 52°31′54″N 21°42′38″E
- Country: Poland
- Voivodeship: Masovian
- County: Węgrów
- Seat: Łochów

Area
  - Total: 194.98 km^{2} (75.28 sq mi)

Population (2013)
  - Total: 17,962
  - Density: 92.122/km^{2} (238.60/sq mi)
  - Urban: 6,786
  - Rural: 11,176
- Website: http://www.gminalochow.pl/

Gmina Łochów is an urban-rural gmina (administrative district) in Węgrów County, Masovian Voivodeship, in east-central Poland. Its seat is the town of Łochów, which lies approximately 26 kilometres (16 mi) north-west of Węgrów and 60 km (37 mi) north-east of Warsaw.

The gmina covers an area of 194.98 square kilometres (75.3 sq mi), and as of 2006 its total population is 17,427 (out of which the population of Łochów amounts to 6,452, and the population of the rural part of the gmina is 10,975).

== Villages ==
Apart from the town of Łochów, Gmina Łochów contains the villages and settlements of Baczki, Barchów, Brzuza, Budziska, Burakowskie, Dąbrowa, Gwizdały, Jasiorówka, Jerzyska, Kalinowiec, Kaliska, Kamionna, Karczewizna, Laski, Łazy, Łojew, Łopianka, Łosiewice, Majdan, Matały, Nadkole, Ogrodniki, Ostrówek, Pogorzelec, Samotrzask, Szumin, Twarogi, Wólka Paplińska, Zagrodniki and Zambrzyniec.

== Neighbouring gminas ==
Gmina Łochów is bordered by the gminas of Brańszczyk, Jadów, Korytnica, Sadowne, Stoczek and Wyszków.
