= Majdan, Gmina Łochów =

Majdan
- Village
- Location within Poland
- Coordinates: 52°33′41″N 21°46′11″E
- Country: Poland
- Voivodeship: Masovian
- County: Węgrów
- Gmina: Łochów
- Population: 157
- Time zone: UTC+1 (CET)
  - Summer (DST): UTC+2 (CEST)
- Postal code: 07-132
- Area code: +48 25
- ISO 3166 code: POL
- Vehicle registration: WWE

Majdan (Polish pronunciation: [ˈmajdan]) is a village in the administrative district of Gmina Łochów, within Węgrów County, Masovian Voivodeship, in east-central Poland.
