= Ostrówek, Węgrów County =

Ostrówek
- Village
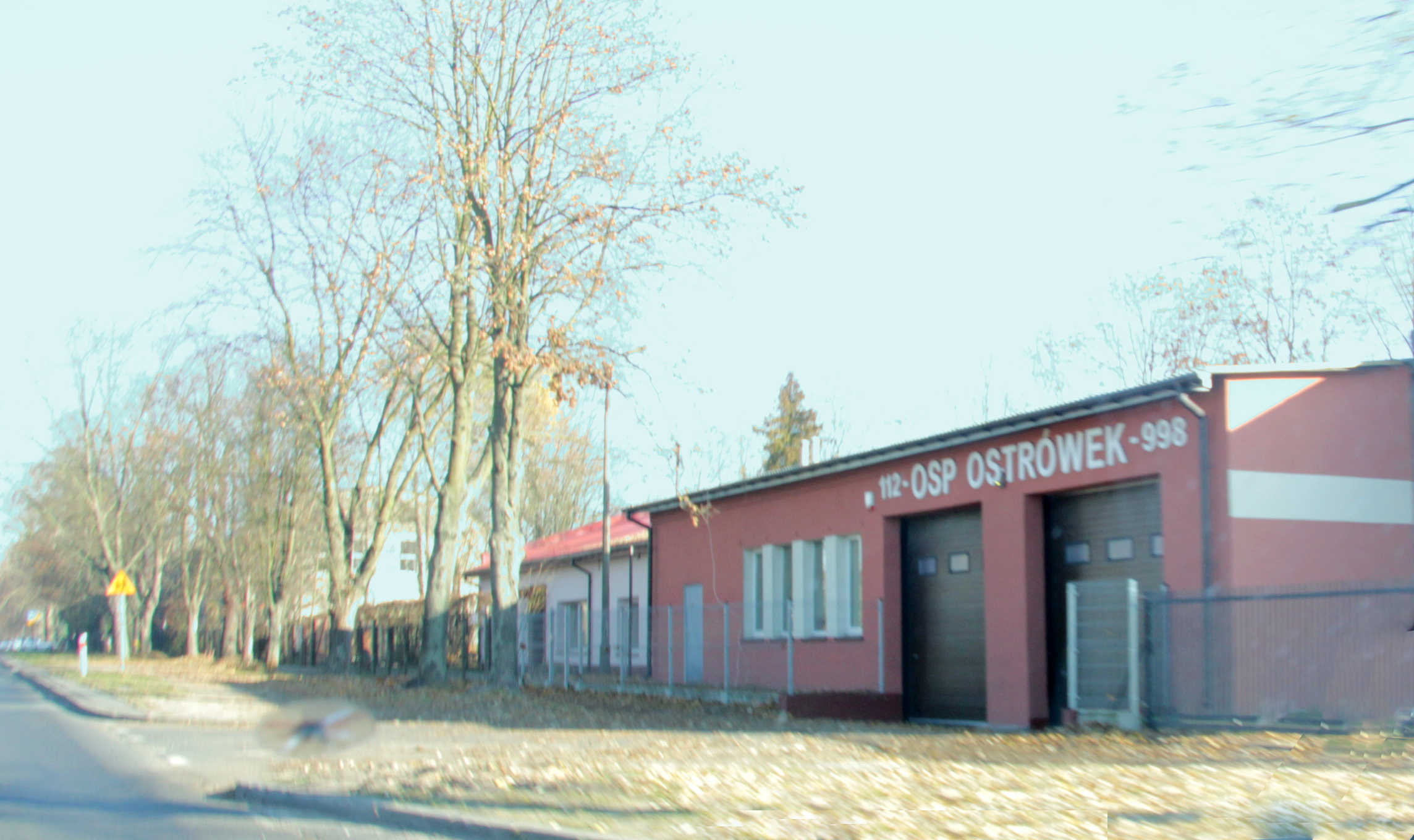

- Location within Poland
- Coordinates: 52°33′N 21°46′E
- Country: Poland
- Voivodeship: Masovian
- County: Węgrów
- Gmina: Łochów

Population (approx.)
  - Total: 1,700
- Time zone: UTC+1 (CET)
  - Summer (DST): UTC+2 (CEST)
- Postal code: 07-132
- Area code: +48 25
- ISO 3166 code: POL
- Vehicle registration: WWE
- Website: http://www.ostrowek.fuks.pl

Ostrówek [ɔsˈtruvɛk] is a village in the administrative district of Gmina Łochów, within Węgrów County, Masovian Voivodeship, in east-central Poland.

One Polish citizen was murdered by Nazi Germany in the village during World War II.
