= Łazy, Węgrów County =

Łazy
- Village
- Location within Poland
- Coordinates: 52°34′N 21°37′E
- Country: Poland
- Voivodeship: Masovian
- County: Węgrów
- Gmina: Łochów

Population
  - Total: 290
- Time zone: UTC+1 (CET)
  - Summer (DST): UTC+2 (CEST)
- Postal code: 07-130
- Area code: +48 25
- ISO 3166 code: POL
- Vehicle registration: WWE

Łazy [ˈwazɨ] is a village in the administrative district of Gmina Łochów, within Węgrów County, Masovian Voivodeship, in east-central Poland.

Eight Polish citizens were murdered by Nazi Germany in the village during World War II.
