= Łopianka =

- Village
- Location within Poland
- Coordinates: 52°33′N 21°44′E
- Country: Poland
- Voivodeship: Masovian
- County: Węgrów
- Gmina: Łochów

Łopianka [wɔˈpjaŋka] is a village in the administrative district of Gmina Łochów, within Węgrów County, Masovian Voivodeship, in east-central Poland.
