= Dąbrowa, Gmina Łochów =

Dąbrowa
- Village
- Location within Poland
- Coordinates: 52°31′21″N 21°48′14″E
- Country: Poland
- Voivodeship: Masovian
- County: Węgrów
- Gmina: Łochów
- Population: 124
- Time zone: UTC+1 (CET)
  - Summer (DST): UTC+2 (CEST)
- Postal code: 07-130
- Area code: +48 25
- ISO 3166 code: POL
- Vehicle registration: WWE

Dąbrowa [dɔmˈbrɔva] is a village in the administrative district of Gmina Łochów, within Węgrów County, Masovian Voivodeship, in east-central Poland.
