= Twarogi =

- Village
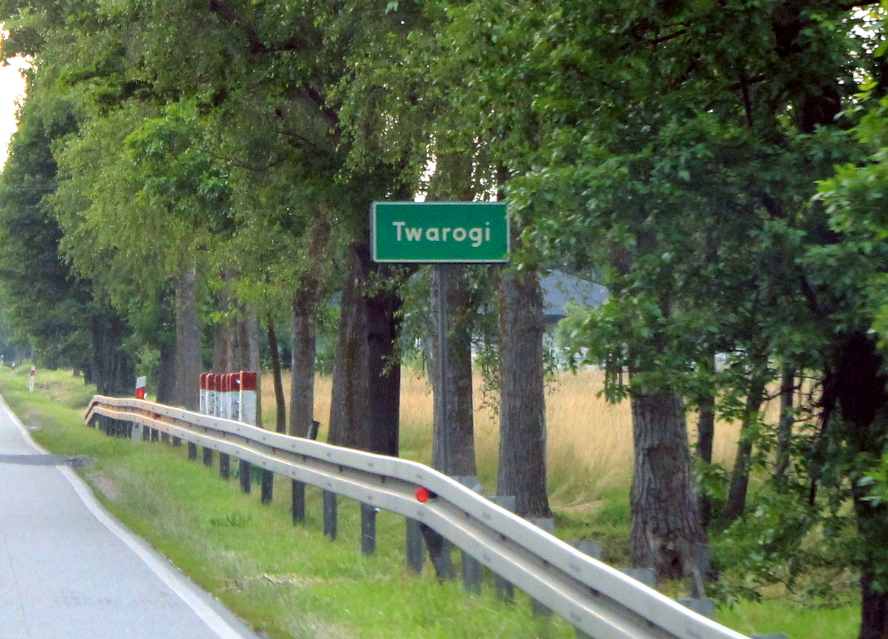

- Location within Poland
- Coordinates: 52°30′N 21°48′E
- Country: Poland
- Voivodeship: Masovian
- County: Węgrów
- Gmina: Łochów

Twarogi [tfaˈrɔɡi] is a village in the administrative district of Gmina Łochów, within Węgrów County, Masovian Voivodeship, in east-central Poland.
