= Łojewo =

Łojewo may refer to the following places:

- Łojewo, Kuyavian-Pomeranian Voivodeship (north-central Poland)
- Łojewo, Pomeranian Voivodeship (north Poland)
- Łojewo, Warmian-Masurian Voivodeship (north Poland)
