= Zakącie =

Zakącie may refer to the following places in Poland:

- Zakącie, Lublin Voivodeship (eastern Poland)
- Zakącie, Masovian Voivodeship (east-central Poland)
