= Ruda Talubska railway station =

Railway station in Masovian, Poland

Ruda Talubska
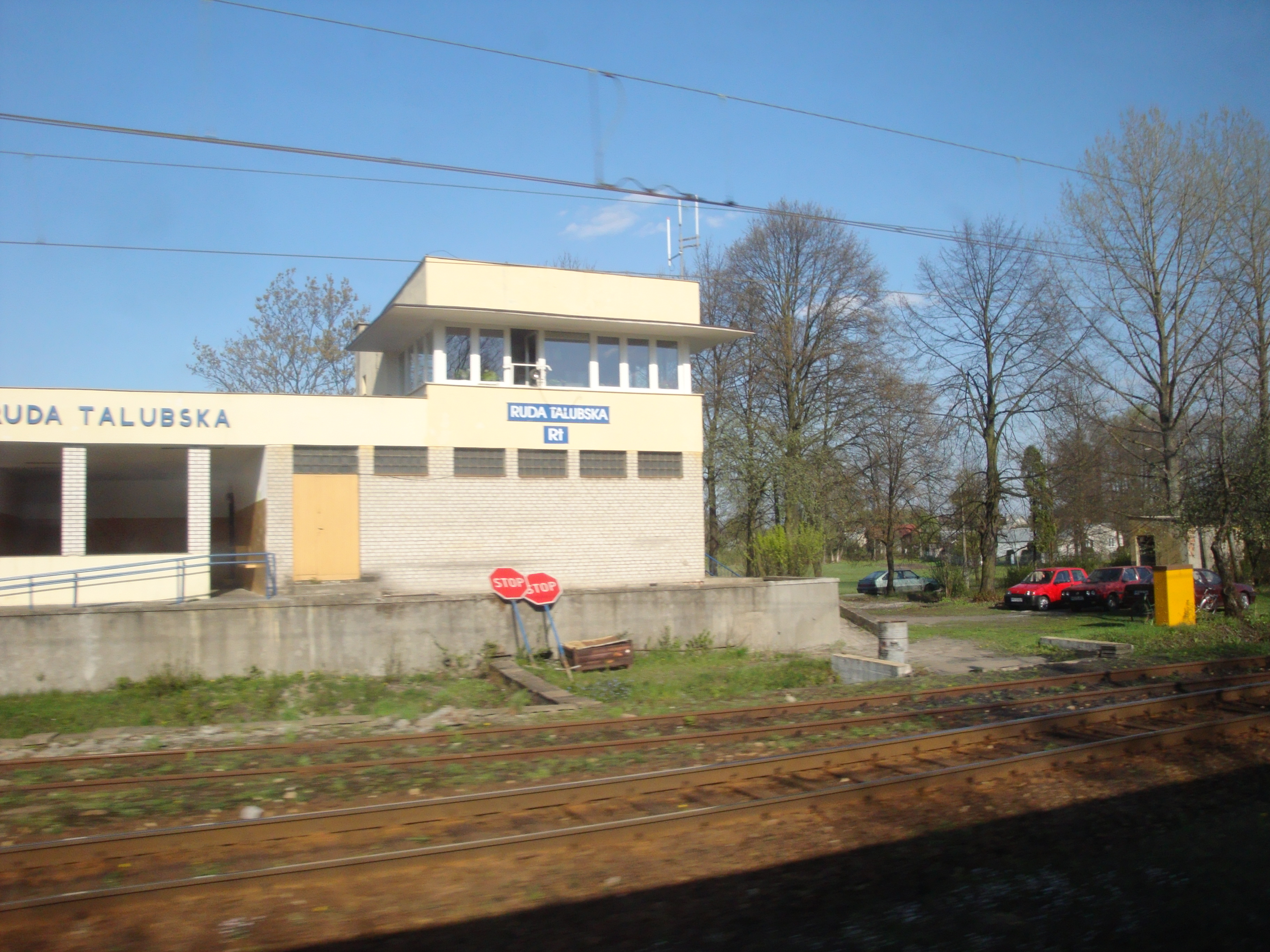

General information
- Location: Ruda Talubska, Garwolin, Garwolin, Masovian; Poland
- Coordinates: 51.8558217°N 21.5876583°E
- System: Rail Station
- Owner: Polskie Koleje Państwowe S.A.

Services
Preceding station	Masovian Railways	Following station
Garwolin towards Warszawa Zachodnia	R7	Wola Rowska towards Dęblin
Location

Ruda Talubska railway station is a railway station at Ruda Talubska, Garwolin, Masovian, Poland. It is served by Masovian Railways.
