= Garwolin =

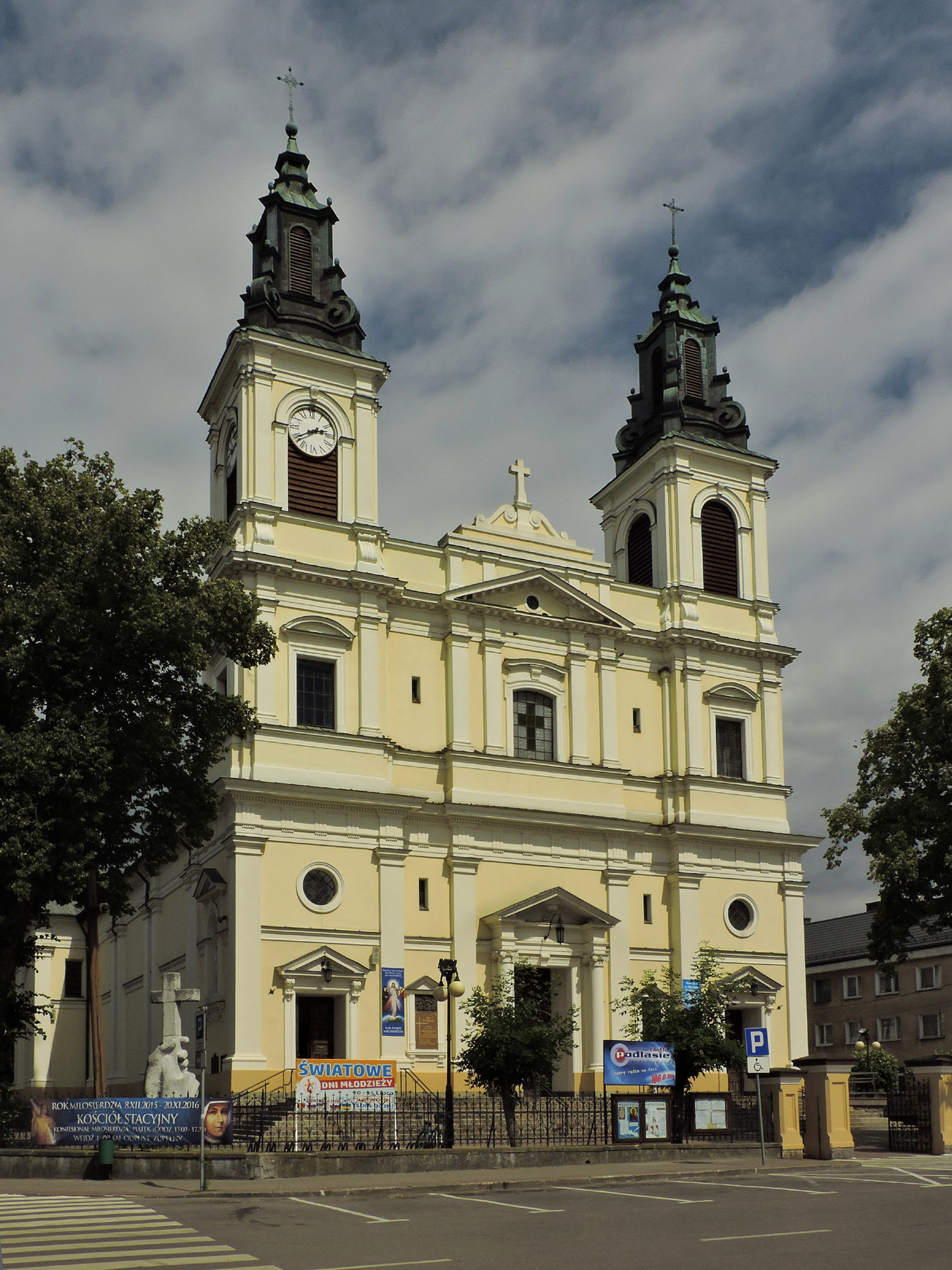
- Collegiate church of Transfiguration in Garwolin

- Flag Coat of arms

- Location within Poland
- Coordinates: 51°53′50″N 21°36′54″E
- Country: Poland
- Voivodeship: Masovian
- County: Garwolin
- Gmina: Garwolin (urban gmina)
- Town rights: 15th century

Government
  - Mayor: Marzena Świeczak

Area
  - Total: 22.08 km^{2} (8.53 sq mi)

Population (31 December 2021)
  - Total: 17,566
  - Density: 795.6/km^{2} (2,060/sq mi)
- Time zone: UTC+1 (CET)
  - Summer (DST): UTC+2 (CEST)
- Postal code: 08-400
- Area code: +48 25
- Car plates: WG
- Website: https://www.garwolin.pl

Garwolin [ɡarˈvɔlʲin] is a town on the Wilga river in eastern Poland, capital of Garwolin County, situated in the southeast part of the Garwolin plateau in Masovian Voivodeship, 62 km (39 mi) southeast of Warsaw, 100 km (62 mi) northwest of Lublin. As of December 2021, the town has 17,566 inhabitants.

== History ==
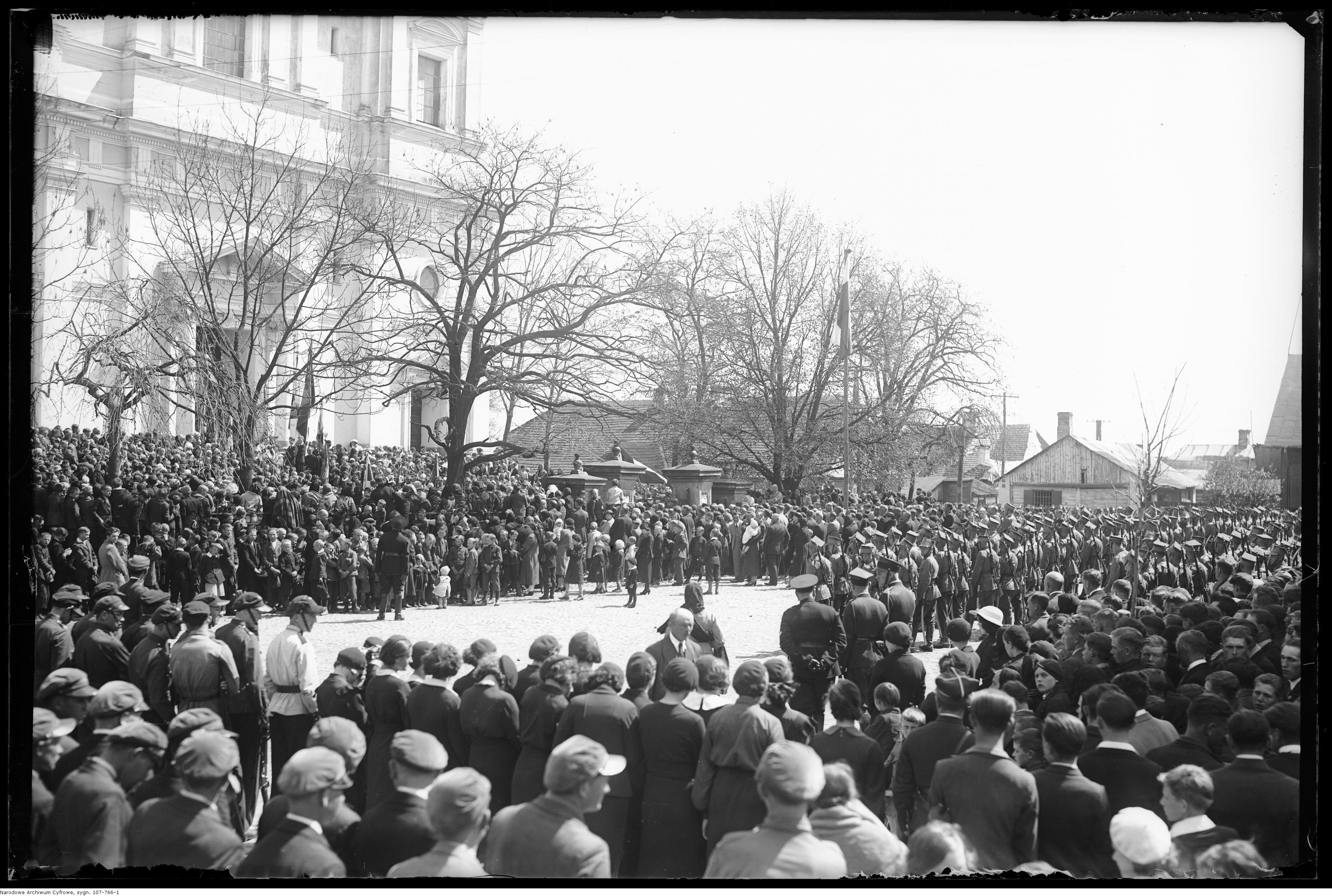
3 May Constitution Day in Garwolin in 1936

The name of the town occurs in the medieval notes in 1386 and 1404. Name Garwolin comes from a Garwoł, which is a name. However, there is a popular legend connecting the town's name with rooks (Polish: gawrony).

Traces of settlement on terrains of present days boundaries of Garwolin are more than 2000 years old. It is believed that Garwolin received its city charter in 1423, but the exact date is unknown; it is almost certain that the document from 1423 was only acknowledgement of before-stated city laws. In time of the Deluge casualties exceeded 90%.

During the Polish–Soviet War, the town was captured and briefly occupied by the invading Russians, before it was recaptured by the Poles led by Gen. Konarzewski on 16 August 1920. Polish Marshal Józef Piłsudski stayed in the town the next day.

During World War II and the Nazi occupation of Poland, about 70% of the city was destroyed. The town and the powiat were administered by Kreishauptmann Karl Freudenthal, who was responsible for the murder of more than 1000 inhabitants, the deportation of several thousand local Poles to concentration camps and slave labor in Nazi Germany, and the transfer of the local Jews to various ghettos in the region. For his war crimes, Freudenthal was sentenced to death by the Polish underground, and the sentence was carried out by the Home Army on 5 July 1944, as part of Operacja Główki ("Operation Heads").

Two Poles from Garwolin were also murdered by the Russians in the large Katyn massacre in 1940, and six died in Soviet Gulag camps between 1939 and 1947.

At the end of July 1944 the Red Army's 2nd Guards Tank Army, under the command of Alexei Radzievsky, routed the German 73rd Infantry Division at Garwolin, capturing its commander, Friedrich Franek.

After the war Garwolin was restored to Poland and enlarged. From 1975 to 1998, it was administratively located in the Siedlce Voivodeship. The Neo-Baroque church, dating from the turn of the 19th and 20th centuries, is a notable building.

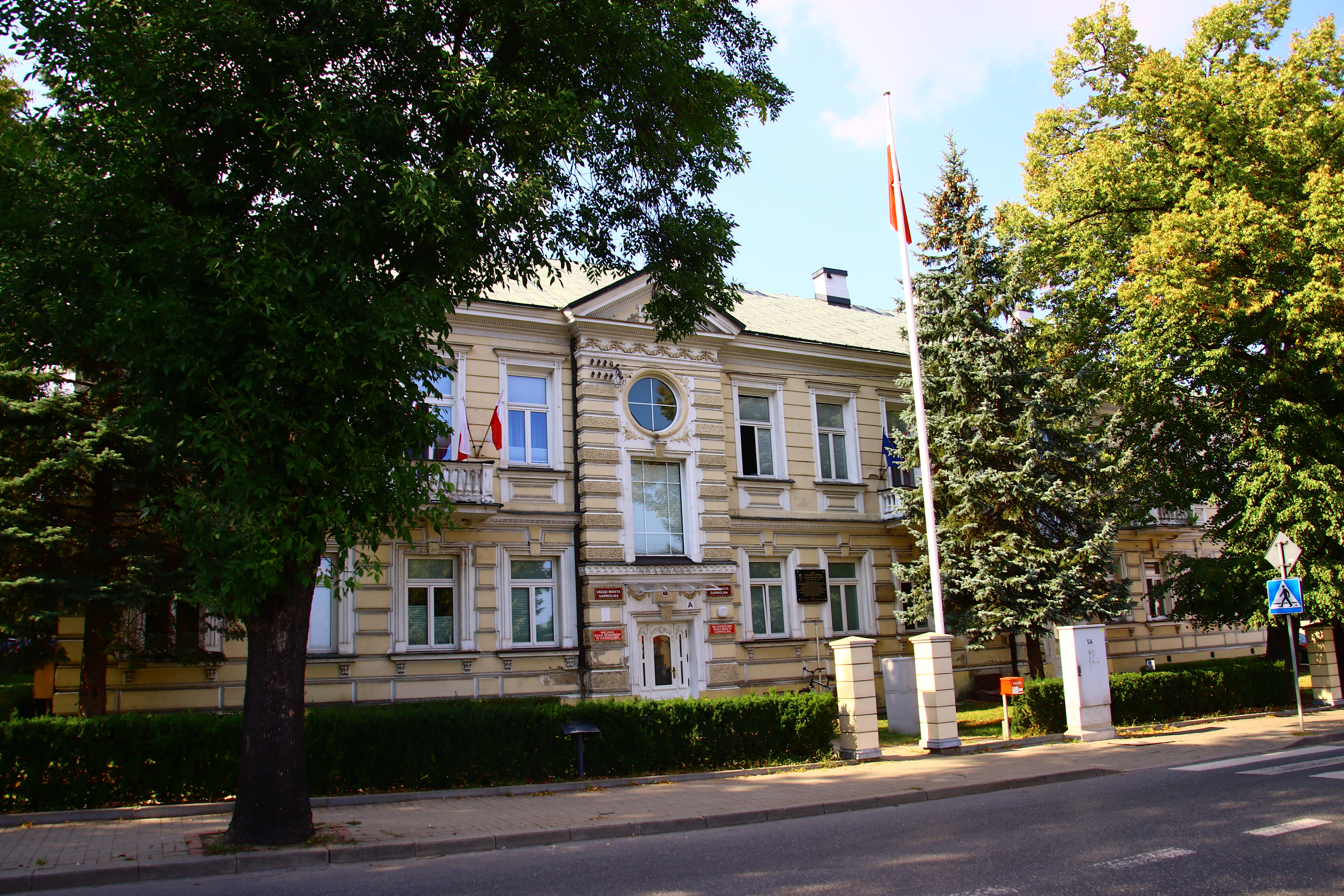
Town hall

== Education ==
- The Józef Piłsudski secondary school - founded in 1918, in the beginning served as a primary school that included only the first 3 levels of education (introductory, first and second grade) and functioned in a building belonging to another school. In the year 1934 the school has moved to a new building in which it functions to this day. In 1937 the school was named after Józef Piłsudski. In the year 2022 the school managed to take 256th place in a national ranking of secondary schools.
- The Cyprian Norwid Catholic secondary school - founded in 1996 by Andrzej Banasiuk, it is the only Catholic school in the town of Garwolin. Since 1999 it has been a public school and is located on the grounds belonging to the Collegiate church of Transfiguration in Garwolin. The school focuses on a religious and patriotic upbringing of its students and cultivating national, religious and school traditions through mass events taking place at the school. In the year 2022 the school managed to take 97th place in a national ranking of secondary schools.
- The Tadeusz Kościuszko upper-secondary school complex nr 2 in Garwolin - founded in 1969 it is one of the two vocational schools in Garwolin. In 1978 it was named after the Polish military engineer Tadeusz Kościuszko. In 2003 the school administration decided to open a non-vocational secondary school in the same building. It was closed down in 2009 after just 6 years of operation
- The Westerplatte heroes upper-secondary school complex nr 1 in Garwolin - established in 1961 by decision of the Board of Trustees of the School District of Warsaw, it was a vocational school focused on education in the field of economics. The school building was built in 1977 and it is used to this day. The design of the building included a 60 square meter mosaic commemorating the achievements of the Polish army. In the year 1997 the school was given the name of "Bohaterów Westerplatte".
- Academy of Management in Łódź, branch in Garwolin.

== Economy ==
Centre of industry and services; machine, means of transport, nutritive (milk co-operative, meat) industries, clothing, leather, construction materials, furniture and cosmetics manufactures.

== Transport ==
=== Roads ===
- S17 expressway: direction Warsaw-Garwolin-Lublin-Hrebenne,
- National road 76: direction Łuków-Garwolin-Wilga.

=== Rail ===
Garwolin railway station is located 5 km (3 mi) west from the center of town in the nearby village Wola Rębkowska, on rail route Warsaw-Lublin.

== Culture and sports ==
- "Wilga" cinema 3D
- Centre of Sports and Culture
- "Garwolanka" swimming pool
- Wilga Garwolin sports Club.
