= Radlinski =

Radlinski or Radliński can refer to:

- Kris Radlinski (born 1976), English rugby league footballer for Wigan Warriors
- Majdan Radliński, village in Lublin Voivodeship, Poland
- Mount Radlinski, West Antarctica
