= Theatre Scena STU =

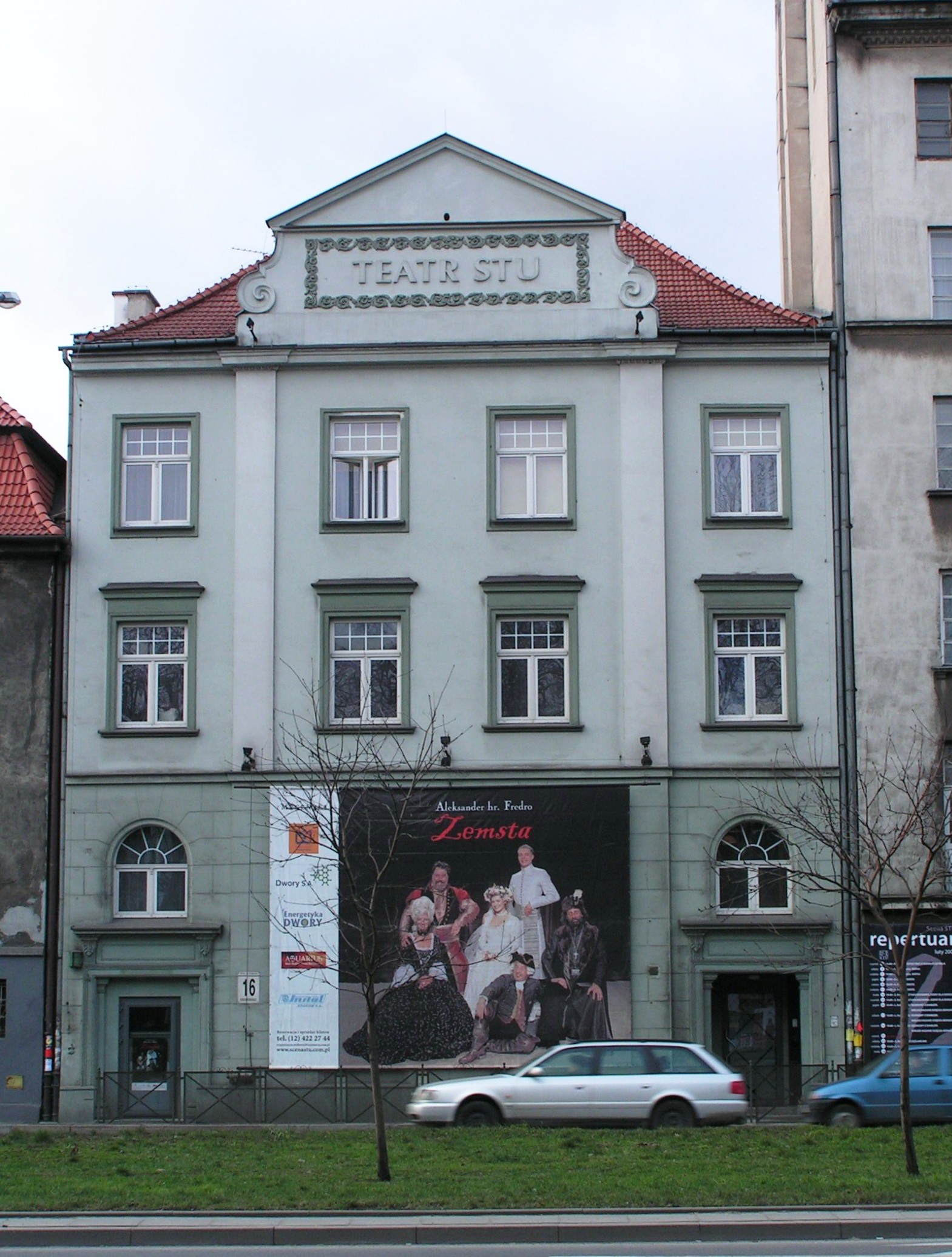
Theater Scena STU

Theatre Scena STU (Krakowski Teatr Scena STU) is located at 16 Krasinskiego Street in Kraków, Poland. Established in 1966 by Krzysztof Jasiński, it started as a member of a group of nonprofessional student theaters. It is considered to be one of the city's most important cultural institutions. The current artistic director is Krzysztof Jasiński.

== Awards ==
- 1975, Grand Prize, 11th annual Student Theatre Festival, Łódź, Poland
