= Białawoda =

Białawoda refers to the following places in Poland:

- Białawoda, Lesser Poland Voivodeship
- Białawoda, Lublin Voivodeship
