= Garwolin railway station =

Railway station in Wola Rębkowska, Poland

Garwolin
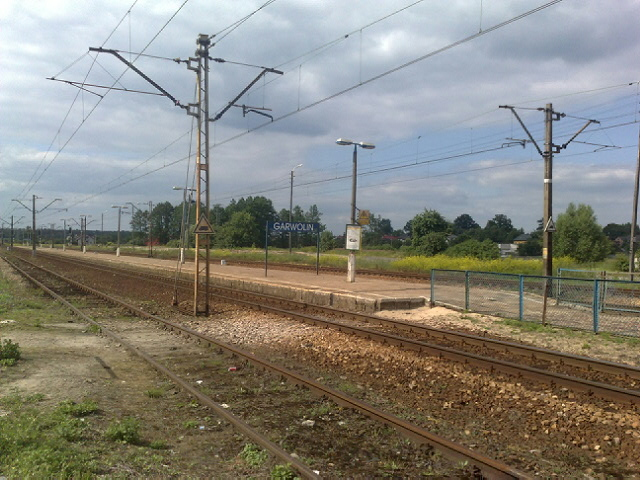

General information
- Location: Wola Rębkowska, Garwolin, Garwolin, Masovian; Poland
- Coordinates: 51.9556982°N 21.5346266°E
- System: Rail Station
- Owner: Polskie Koleje Państwowe S.A.

Services
Preceding station	Masovian Railways	Following station
Pilawa towards Warszawa Zachodnia	R7	Ruda Talubska towards Dęblin
Location
- Location within Masovian Voivodeship Location within Poland Location within Europe

Garwolin railway station is a railway station at Wola Rębkowska, Garwolin, Masovian, Poland. It is served by Masovian Railways.
