= Feliksin, Masovian Voivodeship =

Feliksin
- Village
- Location within Poland
- Coordinates: 51°50′51″N 21°36′39″E
- Country: Poland
- Voivodeship: Masovian
- County: Garwolin
- Gmina: Garwolin
- Population: 1,337

Feliksin [fɛˈlikɕin] is a village in the administrative district of Gmina Garwolin, within Garwolin County, Masovian Voivodeship, in east-central Poland.
