= Sulbiny Górne =

- Village
- Location within Poland
- Coordinates: 51°51′56″N 21°37′42″E
- Country: Poland
- Voivodeship: Masovian
- County: Garwolin
- Gmina: Garwolin
- Postal code: 08-400
- Population: 1,500

Sulbiny Górne [sulˈbinɨ ˈɡurnɛ] is a village in the administrative district of Gmina Garwolin, within Garwolin County, Masovian Voivodeship, in east-central Poland.
