= Stoczek, Garwolin County =

Stoczek
- Village
- Location within Poland
- Coordinates: 51°52′11″N 21°29′38″E
- Country: Poland
- Voivodeship: Masovian
- County: Garwolin
- Gmina: Garwolin

Stoczek [ˈstɔt͡ʂɛk] is a village in the administrative district of Gmina Garwolin, within Garwolin County, Masovian Voivodeship, in east-central Poland.
