= Kępa, Lublin County =

Kępa
- Village
- Location within Poland
- Coordinates: 51°03′47″N 22°14′47″E
- Country: Poland
- Voivodeship: Lublin
- County: Lublin
- Gmina: Borzechów

Kępa [ˈkɛmpa] is a village in the administrative district of Gmina Borzechów, within Lublin County, Lublin Voivodeship, in eastern Poland.
