= Wola Rowska =

- Village

- Location within Poland
- Coordinates: 51°50′N 21°38′E
- Country: Poland
- Voivodeship: Masovian
- County: Garwolin
- Gmina: Łaskarzew
- Time zone: UTC+1 (CET)
  - Summer (DST): UTC+2 (CEST)
- Vehicle registration: WG

Wola Rowska [ˈvɔla ˈrɔfska] is a village in the administrative district of Gmina Łaskarzew, within Garwolin County, Masovian Voivodeship, in east-central Poland.

== History ==
Following the German-Soviet invasion of Poland, which started World War II in September 1939, Wola Rowska was occupied by Germany. The Polish resistance movement was active in the area. During Operation Tempest, the Home Army seized control of the Wola Rowska railway station.
