= Natalia, Masovian Voivodeship =

Natalia
- Village
- Location within Poland
- Coordinates: 51°52′29″N 21°35′59″E
- Country: Poland
- Voivodeship: Masovian
- County: Garwolin
- Gmina: Garwolin
- Population: 180

Natalia [naˈtalja] is a village in the administrative district of Gmina Garwolin, within Garwolin County, Masovian Voivodeship, in east-central Poland.
