= Rębków-Parcele =

- Village
- Location within Poland
- Coordinates: 51°51′53″N 21°33′31″E
- Country: Poland
- Voivodeship: Masovian
- County: Garwolin
- Gmina: Garwolin

Rębków-Parcele [ˈrɛmpkuf parˈt͡sɛlɛ] is a village in the administrative district of Gmina Garwolin, within Garwolin County, Masovian Voivodeship, in east-central Poland.
