= Taluba =

- Village
- Location within Poland
- Coordinates: 51°51′N 21°37′E
- Country: Poland
- Voivodeship: Masovian
- County: Garwolin
- Gmina: Garwolin

Taluba [taˈluba] is a village in the administrative district of Gmina Garwolin, within Garwolin County, Masovian Voivodeship, in east-central Poland.
