= Stara Huta, Garwolin County =

Stara Huta
- Village
- Location within Poland
- Coordinates: 51°55′22″N 21°29′2″E
- Country: Poland
- Voivodeship: Masovian
- County: Garwolin
- Gmina: Garwolin

Stara Huta [ˈstara ˈxuta] is a village in the administrative district of Gmina Garwolin, within Garwolin County, Masovian Voivodeship, in east-central Poland.
