= Uśniaki =

- Village
- Location within Poland
- Coordinates: 51°54′N 21°27′E
- Country: Poland
- Voivodeship: Masovian
- County: Garwolin
- Gmina: Garwolin

Uśniaki [uɕˈɲaki] is a village in the administrative district of Gmina Garwolin, within Garwolin County, Masovian Voivodeship, in east-central Poland.
