= Majdan Borzechowski =

- Village
- Location within Poland
- Coordinates: 51°06′46″N 22°19′25″E
- Country: Poland
- Voivodeship: Lublin
- County: Lublin
- Gmina: Borzechów

Majdan Borzechowski (Polish pronunciation: [ˈmajdan bɔʐɛˈxɔfskʲi]) is a village in the administrative district of Gmina Borzechów, within Lublin County, Lublin Voivodeship, in eastern Poland.
