= Ludwinów, Gmina Borzechów =

Ludwinów
- Village
- Location within Poland
- Coordinates: 51°02′24″N 22°11′48″E
- Country: Poland
- Voivodeship: Lublin
- County: Lublin
- Gmina: Borzechów

Ludwinów [ludˈvinuf] is a village in the administrative district of Gmina Borzechów, within Lublin County, Lublin Voivodeship, in eastern Poland.
