= Łączki-Pawłówek =

- Village
- Location within Poland
- Coordinates: 51°07′03″N 22°17′25″E
- Country: Poland
- Voivodeship: Lublin
- County: Lublin
- Gmina: Borzechów

Łączki-Pawłówek [ˈwɔnt͡ʂki paˈvwuvɛk] is a village in the administrative district of Gmina Borzechów, within Lublin County, Lublin Voivodeship, in eastern Poland.
