= Krystyna, Masovian Voivodeship =

Village in Masovian Voivodeship, Poland

Krystyna
- Village
- Location within Poland
- Coordinates: 51°55′21″N 21°31′57″E
- Country: Poland
- Voivodeship: Masovian
- County: Garwolin
- Gmina: Garwolin
- Time zone: UTC+1 (CET)
  - Summer (DST): UTC+2 (CEST)

Krystyna [krɨsˈtɨna] is a village in the administrative district of Gmina Garwolin, within Garwolin County, Masovian Voivodeship, in east-central Poland.

Six Polish citizens were murdered by Nazi Germany in the village during World War II.
