= Kaźmierów, Lublin Voivodeship =

Kaźmierów
- Village
- Location within Poland
- Coordinates: 51°3′2″N 22°15′39″E
- Country: Poland
- Voivodeship: Lublin
- County: Lublin
- Gmina: Borzechów

Kaźmierów [kaʑˈmjɛruf] is a village in the administrative district of Gmina Borzechów, within Lublin County, Lublin Voivodeship, in eastern Poland.
