= Łopiennik, Lublin Voivodeship =

Łopiennik
- Village
- Location within Poland
- Coordinates: 51°02′56″N 22°13′42″E
- Country: Poland
- Voivodeship: Lublin
- County: Lublin
- Gmina: Borzechów
- Time zone: UTC+1 (CET)
  - Summer (DST): UTC+2 (CEST)

Łopiennik [wɔˈpjɛnnik] is a village in the administrative district of Gmina Borzechów, within Lublin County, Lublin Voivodeship, in eastern Poland.

== History ==
14 Polish citizens were murdered by Nazi Germany in the village during World War II.
