= Czyszkówek =

- Village
- Location within Poland
- Coordinates: 51°53′N 21°36′E
- Country: Poland
- Voivodeship: Masovian
- County: Garwolin
- Gmina: Garwolin

Czyszkówek [t͡ʂɨʂˈkuvɛk] is a village in the administrative district of Gmina Garwolin, within Garwolin County, Masovian Voivodeship, in east-central Poland.
