= Wola Rowska railway station =

Railway station in Wola Rowska, Poland

Wola Rowska

General information
- Location: Wola Rowska, Łaskarzew, Garwolin, Masovian; Poland
- Coordinates: 51.821075°N 21.6011659°E
- System: Rail Station
- Owner: Polskie Koleje Państwowe S.A.

Services
Preceding station	Masovian Railways	Following station
Ruda Talubska towards Warszawa Zachodnia	R7	Łaskarzew Przystanek towards Dęblin
Location

Wola Rowska railway station is a railway station at Wola Rowska, Garwolin, Masovian, Poland. It is served by Masovian Railways.
