= Górki, Garwolin County =

Górki
- Village
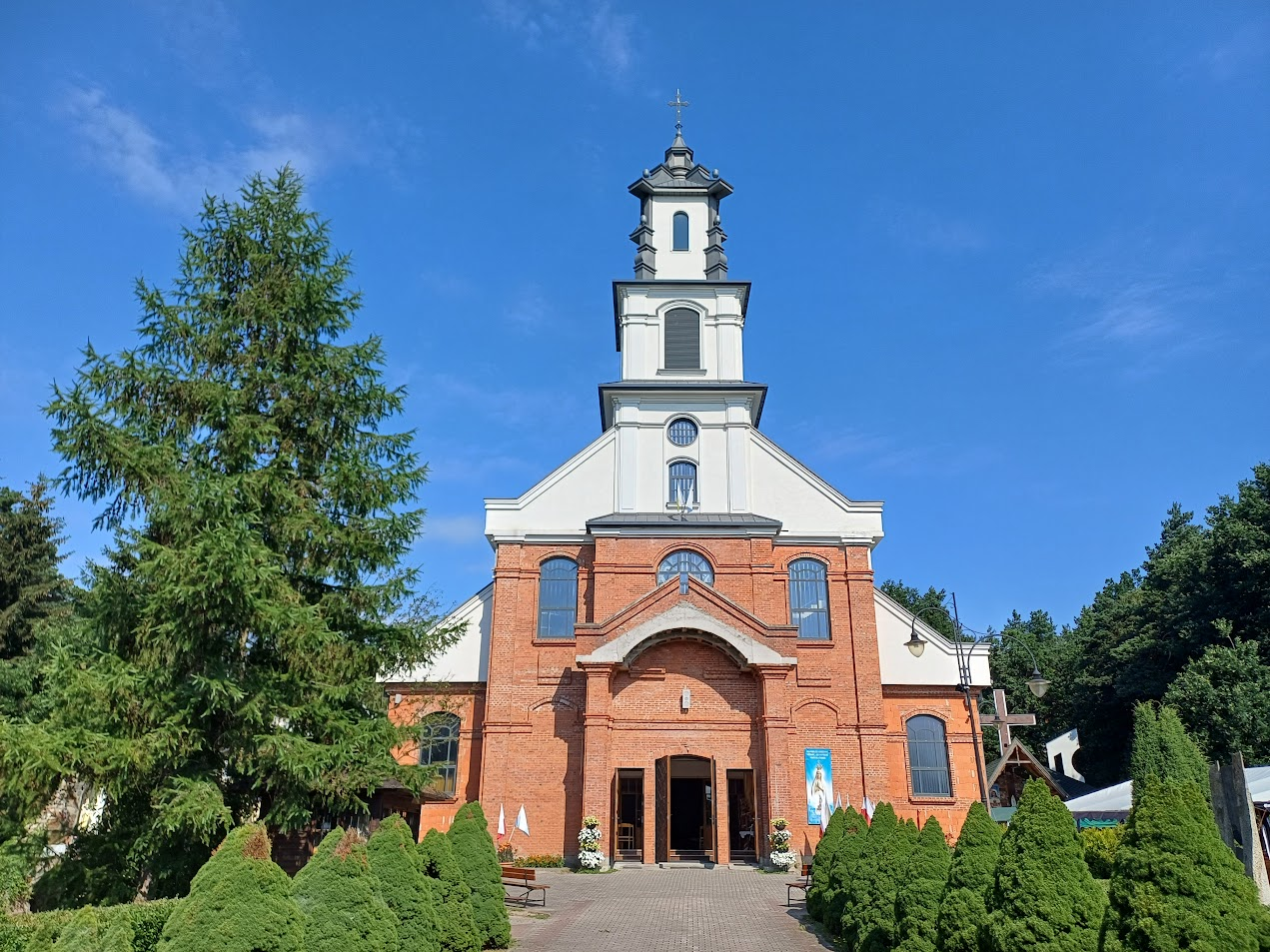
- Our Lady of the Scapular church in Górki

- Location within Poland
- Coordinates: 51°51′40″N 21°34′33″E
- Country: Poland
- Voivodeship: Masovian
- County: Garwolin
- Gmina: Garwolin

Population
  - Total: 370
- Time zone: UTC+1 (CET)
  - Summer (DST): UTC+2 (CEST)

Górki [ˈɡurki] is a village in the administrative district of Gmina Garwolin, within Garwolin County, Masovian Voivodeship, in east-central Poland.

Six Polish citizens were murdered by Nazi Germany in the village during World War II.
