= Osina, Lublin Voivodeship =

Osina
- Village
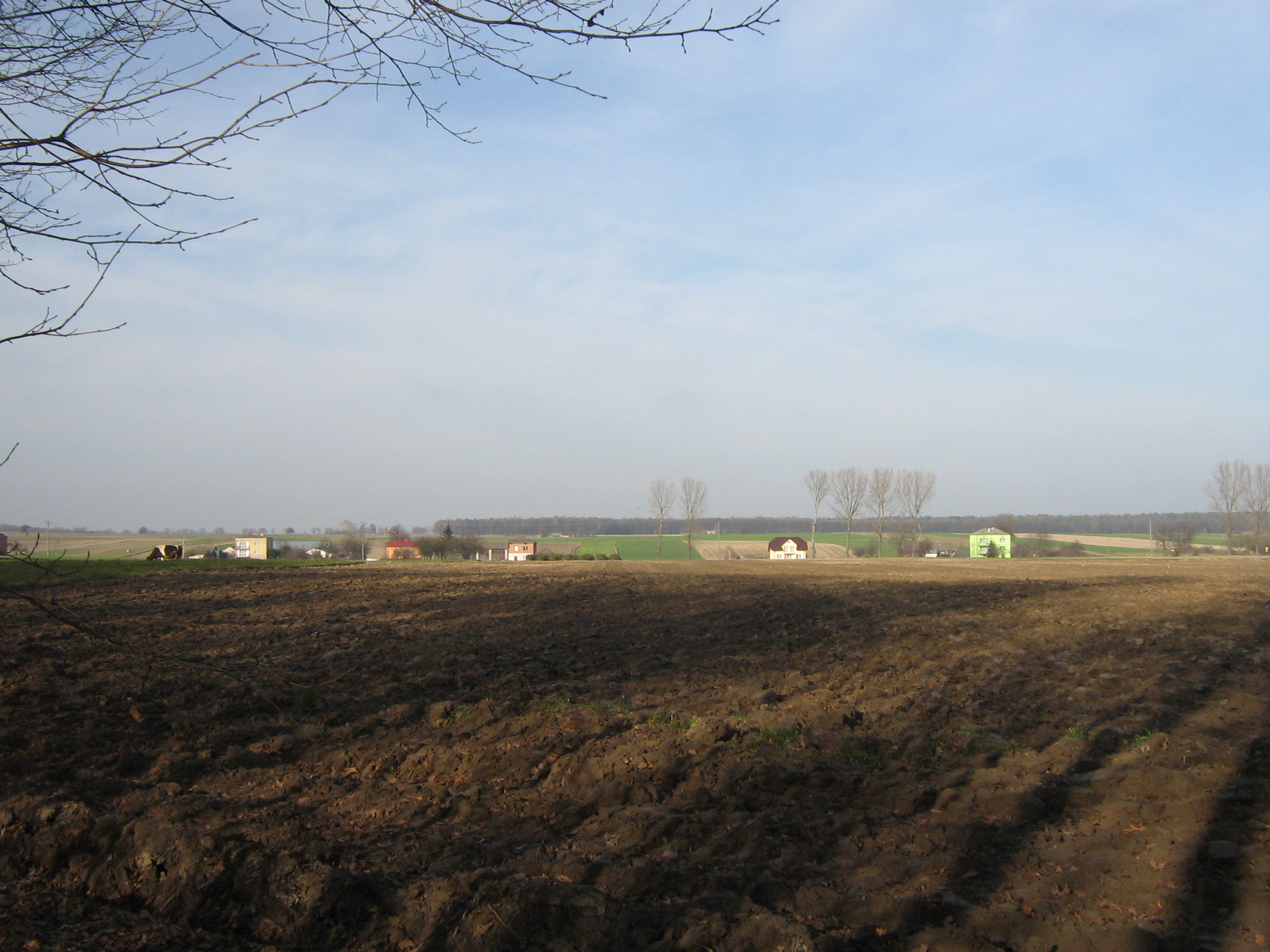
- View of Osina

- Location within Poland
- Coordinates: 51°03′22″N 23°19′57″E
- Country: Poland
- Voivodeship: Lublin
- County: Lublin
- Gmina: Borzechów

Osina [ɔˈɕina] is a village in the administrative district of Gmina Borzechów, within Lublin County, Lublin Voivodeship, in eastern Poland.
