= Majdan Skrzyniecki =

- Village
- Location within Poland
- Coordinates: 51°6′N 22°15′E
- Country: Poland
- Voivodeship: Lublin
- County: Lublin
- Gmina: Borzechów

Majdan Skrzyniecki (Polish pronunciation: [ˈmajdan skʂɨˈɲɛtskʲi]) is a village in the administrative district of Gmina Borzechów, within Lublin County, Lublin Voivodeship, in eastern Poland.
