= Lucin, Garwolin County =

Lucin
- Village
- Location within Poland
- Coordinates: 51°52′53″N 21°36′47″E
- Country: Poland
- Voivodeship: Masovian
- County: Garwolin
- Gmina: Garwolin

Lucin [ˈlut͡ɕin] is a village in the administrative district of Gmina Garwolin, within Garwolin County, Masovian Voivodeship, in east-central Poland.
