= Dąbrowa, Lublin County =

Dąbrowa
- Village
- Location within Poland
- Coordinates: 51°02′42″N 22°16′59″E
- Country: Poland
- Voivodeship: Lublin
- County: Lublin
- Gmina: Borzechów

Dąbrowa [dɔmˈbrɔva] is a village in the administrative district of Gmina Borzechów, within Lublin County, Lublin Voivodeship, in eastern Poland.
