= Kłodnica Dolna =

- Village
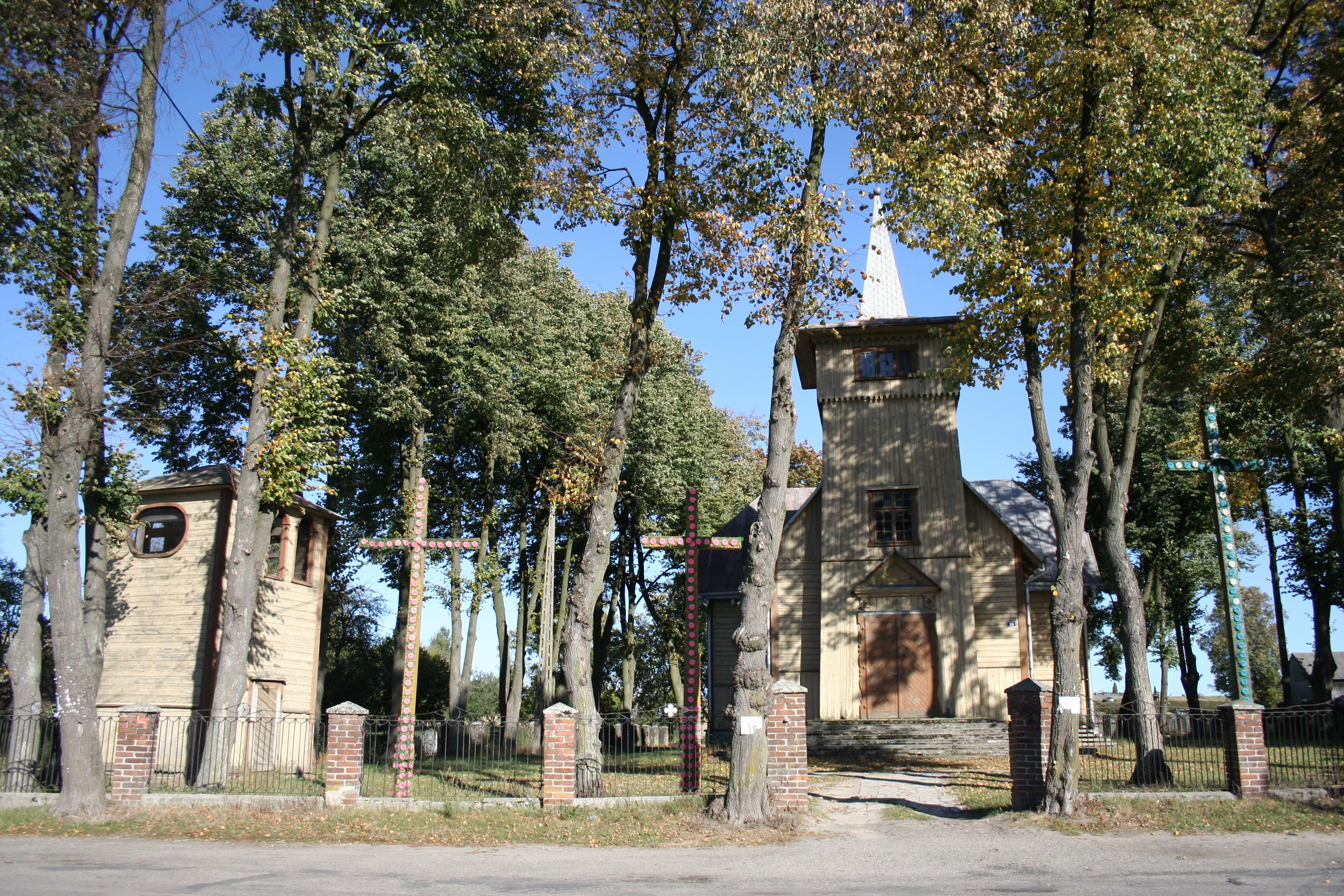

- Location within Poland
- Coordinates: 51°04′16″N 22°17′25″E
- Country: Poland
- Voivodeship: Lubin
- County: Lubin
- Gmina: Borzechów
- Time zone: UTC+1 (CET)
  - Summer (DST): UTC+2 (CEST)

Kłodnica Dolna [kwɔdˈnit͡sa ˈdɔlna] is a village in the administrative district of Gmina Borzechów, within Lublin County, Lublin Voivodeship, in eastern Poland.

== History ==
Five Polish citizens were murdered by Nazi Germany in the village during World War II.
