= Kolonia Łopiennik =

- Village
- Location within Poland
- Coordinates: 51°03′26″N 22°13′37″E
- Country: Poland
- Voivodeship: Lublin
- County: Lublin
- Gmina: Borzechów

Kolonia Łopiennik [kɔˈlɔɲa wɔˈpjɛnnik] is a village in the administrative district of Gmina Borzechów, within Lublin County, Lublin Voivodeship, in eastern Poland.
