= Izdebnik, Masovian Voivodeship =

Izdebnik
- Village
- Location within Poland
- Coordinates: 51°50′50″N 21°32′52″E
- Country: Poland
- Voivodeship: Masovian
- County: Garwolin
- Gmina: Garwolin

Izdebnik (Polish pronunciation: [izˈdɛbɲik]) is a village in the administrative district of Gmina Garwolin, within Garwolin County, Masovian Voivodeship, in east-central Poland.
