= Grabówka, Lublin County =

Grabówka
- Village
- Location within Poland
- Coordinates: 51°06′42″N 22°18′17″E
- Country: Poland
- Voivodeship: Lublin
- County: Lublin
- Gmina: Borzechów

Grabówka [ɡraˈbufka] is a village in the administrative district of Gmina Borzechów, within Lublin County, Lublin Voivodeship, in eastern Poland.
