= Krzysztof Jasiński =

Polish actor, TV and theatre director (born 1943)

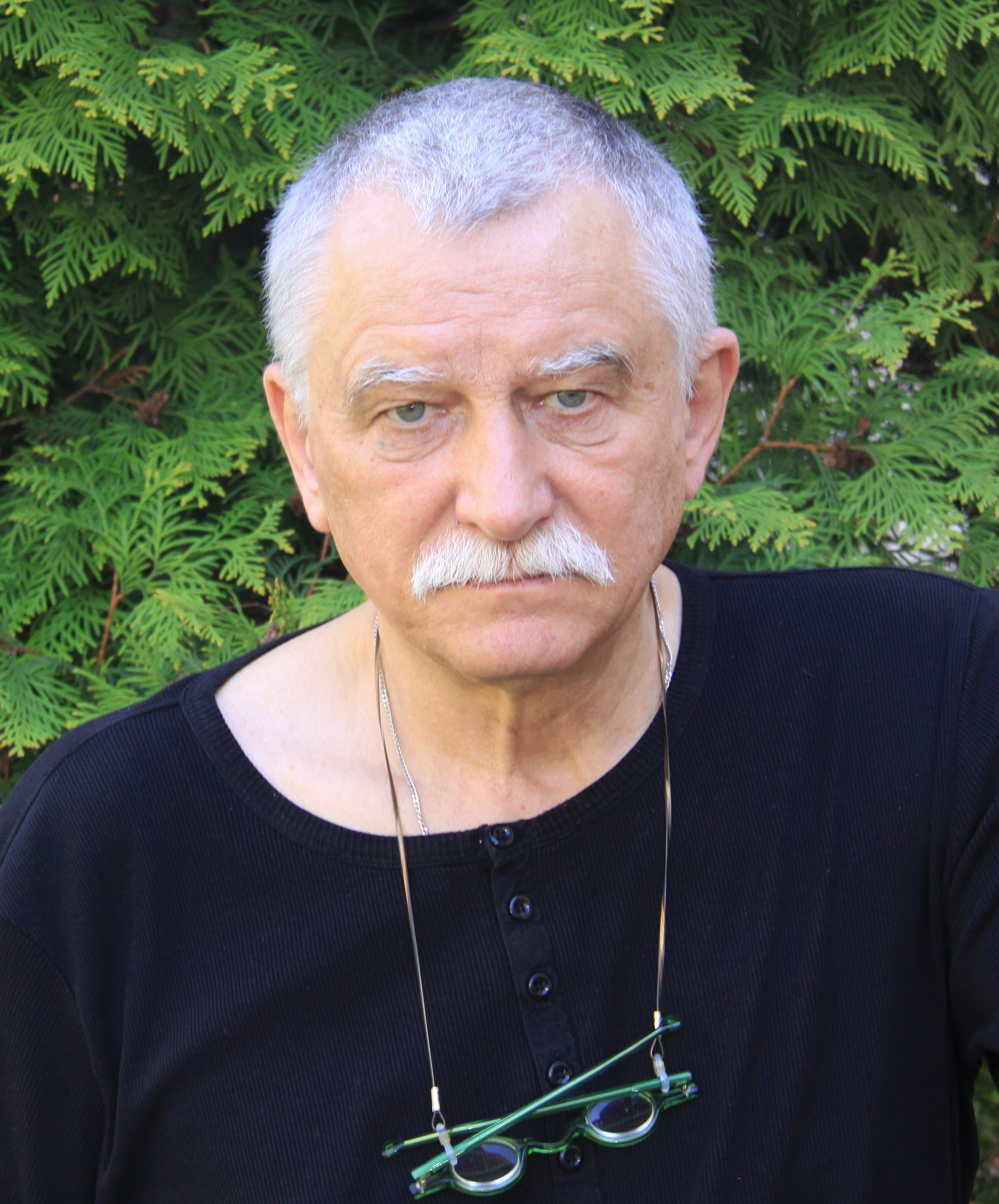
- Born: July 21, 1943 (age 82); Borzechów, Poland
- Occupations: Actor; Film director Theatre director
- Years active: 1970 - present
- Spouse(s): Maryla Rodowicz (divorced); Beata Rybotycka

Krzysztof Jasiński (born July 21, 1943, in Borzechów) is a Polish actor, TV and theatre director.

In 1966 he established the Theatre STU in Kraków.

Krzysztof Jasiński directed also many operas, including Rigoletto in the Grand Theatre in Poznań (2002) and Halka in the Kraków Opera (2004).

== Filmography ==
- 1970 - Prom
- 1973 - Portraits from Cracow
- 1976 - Zaklęty dwór as Damazy Czorgut
- 1981 - W obronie własnej as Krzysztof
- 1982 - Wilczyca as Kacper Wosiński
- 1988 - Powrót do Polski as Ignacy Jan Paderewski
- 1989 - Kanclerz as Samuel Zborowski
- 1989 - Żelazną ręką as Samuel Zborowski
- 1990 - Kapitan Conrad as Apollo Korzeniowski Nałęcz
- 1991 - Kapitan Conrad (Joseph Conrad) (serial) as Apollo Korzeniowski
- 1994 - Legenda Tatr
- 2000 - Klasa na obcasach
- 2001 - Więzy krwi
- 2008-2009 - BrzydUla as Krzysztof Dobrzański
