= Wola Władysławowska =

- Village
- Location within Poland
- Coordinates: 51°53′33″N 21°25′40″E
- Country: Poland
- Voivodeship: Masovian
- County: Garwolin
- Gmina: Garwolin

Wola Władysławowska [ˈvɔla vwadɨswaˈvɔfska] is a village in the administrative district of Gmina Garwolin, within Garwolin County, Masovian Voivodeship, in east-central Poland.
