= Kłodnica Górna =

- Village
- Location within Poland
- Coordinates: 51°03′20″N 22°17′20″E
- Country: Poland
- Voivodeship: Lublin
- County: Lublin
- Gmina: Borzechów

Kłodnica Górna [kwɔdˈnit͡sa ˈɡurna] is a village in the administrative district of Gmina Borzechów, within Lublin County, Lublin Voivodeship, in eastern Poland.
