= Wilkowyja, Masovian Voivodeship =

Wilkowyja
- Village
- Location within Poland
- Coordinates: 51°51′27″N 21°31′31″E
- Country: Poland
- Voivodeship: Masovian
- County: Garwolin
- Gmina: Garwolin
- Population: 423

Wilkowyja [vilkɔˈvɨja] is a village in the administrative district of Gmina Garwolin, within Garwolin County, Masovian Voivodeship, in east-central Poland.
