= Gmina Borzechów =

Gmina Borzechów Borzechów Commune
- Gmina
- Interactive map of Gmina Borzechów
- Coordinates (Borzechów): 51°6′N 22°17′E
- Country: Poland
- Voivodeship: Lublin
- County: Lublin County
- Seat: Borzechów

Area
  - Total: 67.37 km^{2} (26.01 sq mi)

Population (2019)
  - Total: 3,748
  - Density: 55.63/km^{2} (144.1/sq mi)
- Website: http://www.borzechow.lubelskie.pl

Gmina Borzechów is a rural gmina (administrative district) in Lublin County, Lublin Voivodeship, in eastern Poland. Its seat is the village of Borzechów, which lies approximately 26 kilometres (16 mi) south-west of the regional capital Lublin.

The gmina covers an area of 67.37 square kilometres (26.0 sq mi), and as of 2006 its total population is 3,748 (3,843 in 2013).

== Villages ==
Gmina Borzechów contains the villages and settlements of Białawoda, Borzechów, Borzechów-Kolonia, Dąbrowa, Dobrowola, Grabówka, Kaźmierów, Kępa, Kępa Borzechowska, Kępa-Kolonia, Kłodnica Dolna, Kłodnica Górna, Kolonia Łopiennik, Łączki-Pawłówek, Łopiennik, Ludwinów, Majdan Borzechowski, Majdan Radliński, Majdan Skrzyniecki, Osina, Ryczydół and Zakącie.

== Neighbouring gminas ==
Gmina Borzechów is bordered by the gminas of Bełżyce, Chodel, Niedrzwica Duża, Urzędów and Wilkołaz.
