= Unin-Kolonia =

- Village
- Location within Poland
- Coordinates: 51°54′20″N 21°40′0″E
- Country: Poland
- Voivodeship: Masovian
- County: Garwolin
- Gmina: Garwolin

Unin-Kolonia [ˈunin kɔˈlɔɲa] is a village in the administrative district of Gmina Garwolin, within Garwolin County, Masovian Voivodeship, in east-central Poland.
