= Collegiate Church of the Transfiguration of Jesus (Garwolin) =

Church of the Garwolin Parish in Poland

Coordinates: 51.8976°N 21.6173°E

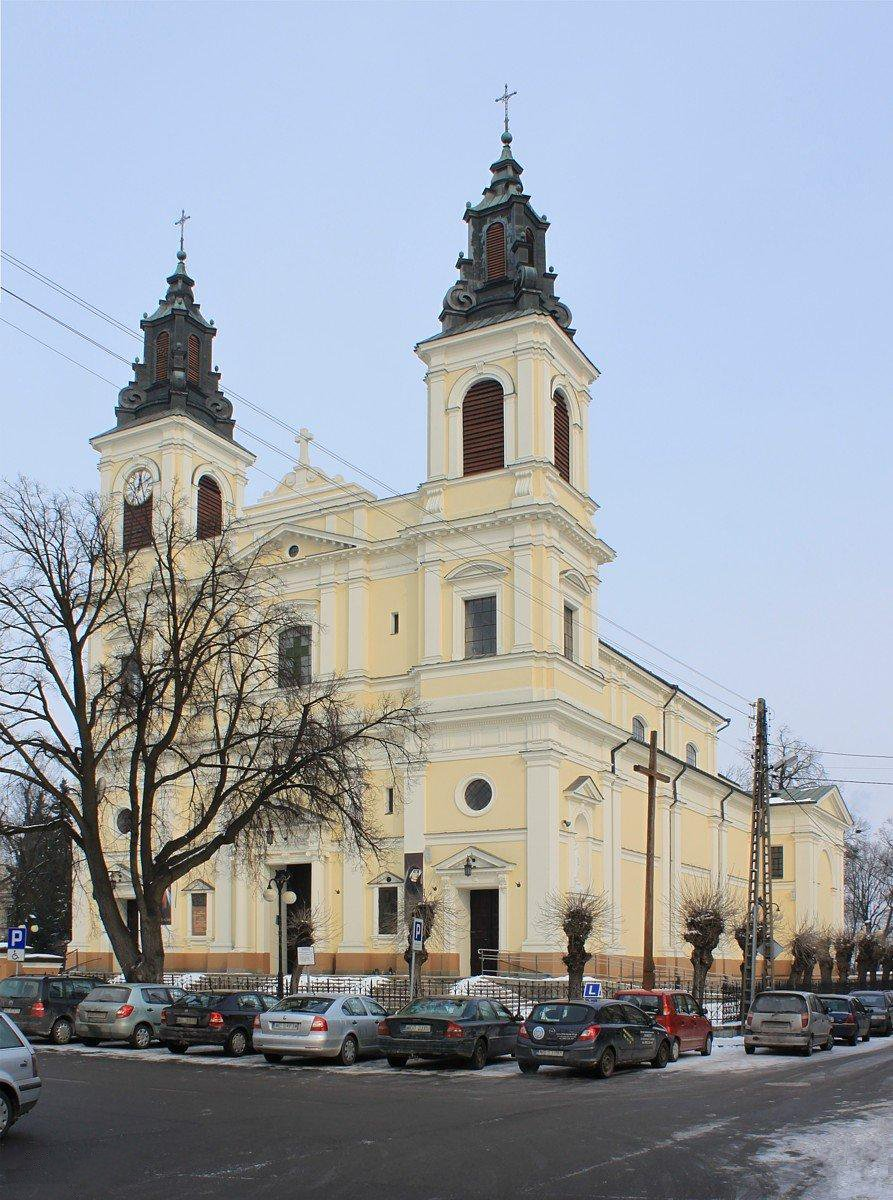
Exterior (2011)

The Collegiate Church of the Transfiguration of Jesus is a Catholic church in the Garwolin parish in the town of Garwolin in Poland. It belongs to the Siedlce diocese and is listed as an official monument. The church was built at the turn of the 19th and 20th century in the neo-baroque style. It is the largest parish in Garwolin by registered members.

== History ==
The first mentions of the Garwolin parish trace back to the year 1418. The original idea for an establishment of a parish was given by the then owner of Garwolin - Duke Janusz II - in 1407, but the act of establishment of the parish was lost after the death of pastor Kacper Sadłoch in 1603. The church in its oldest form was a wooden church built in the 15th century, named after the "Assumption of the Blessed Virgin Mary". The construction of the neo-baroque building started in 1890 in place of an older building that was demolished due to a risk of collapsing. In the year 1900 the church was consecrated under the name of "Transfiguration" by bishop Franciszek Jaczewski. During World War 2 during the bombardment of Garwolin the wooden roof of the church was set aflame and burned down along with three towers and a few paintings inside.

== Architecture ==
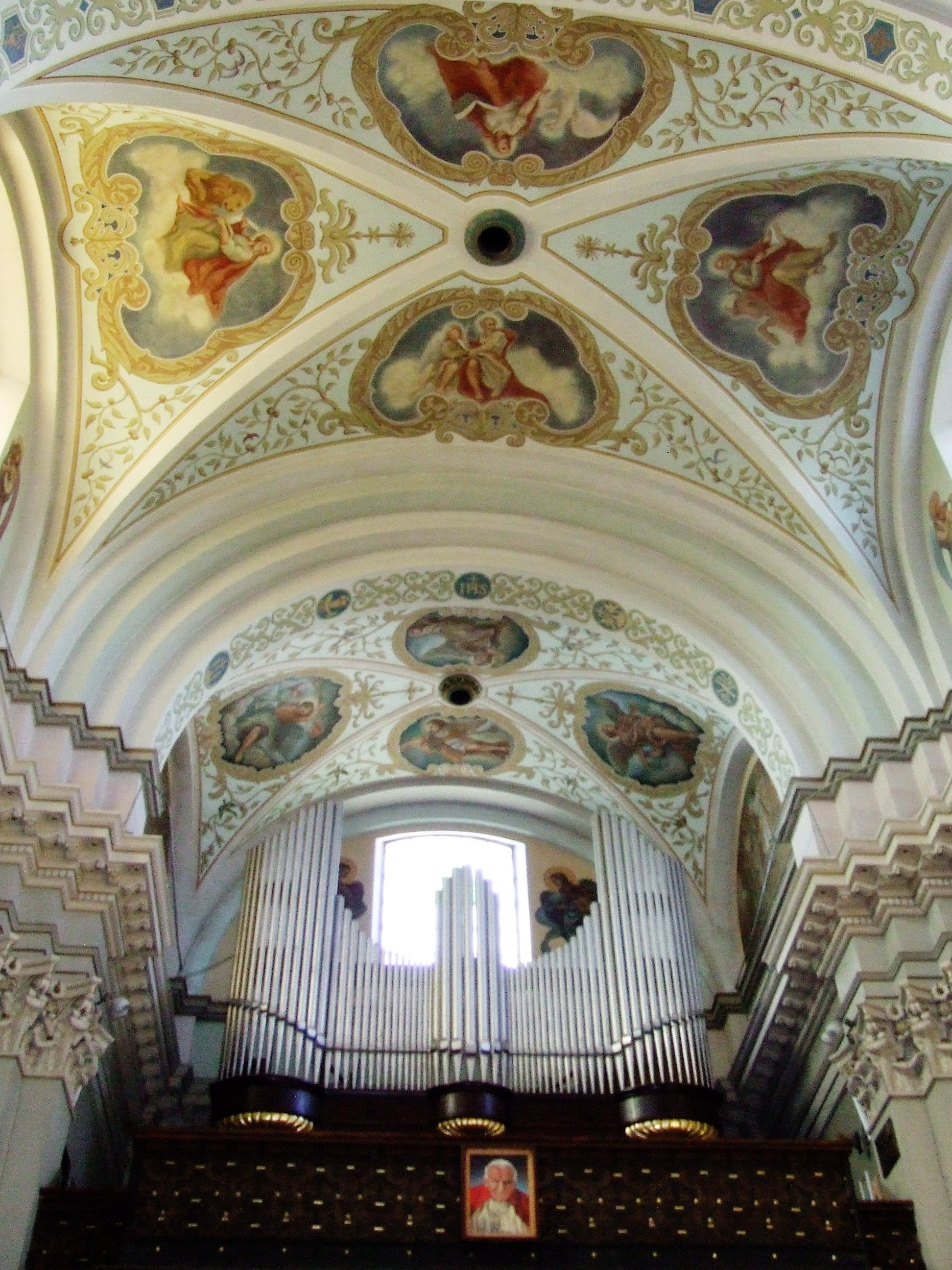
Interior (2012)

The church was constructed in the shape of a cross with one main nave and two side naves in the neo-baroque style. The ceiling and walls are decorated with paintings with the former representing biblical characters and the latter, various saints. The backdrop of the altar is ordained with golden and silver statues and columns as well as paintings called "Transfiguration" and "Black Madonna of Częstochowa".

== Statistics ==
There are 12,200 people registered to this parish with 110 of them not being of Catholic faith, making it the largest by number of registered members in the Deanery of Garwolin. The parish also holds record books going back to 1777.
