= Kępa Borzechowska =

- Village
- Location within Poland
- Coordinates: 51°6′N 22°18′E
- Country: Poland
- Voivodeship: Lublin
- County: Lublin
- Gmina: Borzechów

Kępa Borzechowska [ˈkɛmpa bɔʐɛˈxɔfska] is a village in the administrative district of Gmina Borzechów, within Lublin County, Lublin Voivodeship, in eastern Poland.

The village is an expansion of Borzechów's southern section to the east. The division of the Borzechów estate led to its creation. The settlements of Kepy, Kodnica, and Borzechów Kolonia border its fields. Administratively speaking, it was divided in 1899. It is referred to as "słomianki" in oral tradition. Its name derives from the term straw, which is short for cereal blades that were once used to cover roofs and weave fences after being threshed.

Currently, Słomianka is referred to more frequently than Kępa Borzechowska itself. The full name has two components. Kępa is a characteristic that sets Borzechów apart from other local names. Its name is a combination of the town's name and the name of the region covered in a grove of trees and plants.

There are no notable monuments in the village. Only a wooden crucifix from 1906 and a forge made of wood built in the 1930s have survived to the present.
