= Ryczydół =

- Village
- Location within Poland
- Coordinates: 51°02′27″N 22°18′13″E
- Country: Poland
- Voivodeship: Lublin
- County: Lublin
- Gmina: Borzechów

Ryczydół [rɨˈt͡ʂɨduu̯] is a village in the administrative district of Gmina Borzechów, within Lublin County, Lublin Voivodeship, in eastern Poland.
