= Majdan Radliński =

- Village
- Location within Poland
- Coordinates: 51°3′N 22°14′E
- Country: Poland
- Voivodeship: Lublin
- County: Lublin
- Gmina: Borzechów

Majdan Radliński (Polish pronunciation: [ˈmajdan raˈdlij̃skʲi]) is a village in the administrative district of Gmina Borzechów, within Lublin County, Lublin Voivodeship, in eastern Poland.
