= Borzechów =

- Village
- Location within Poland
- Coordinates: 51°6′N 22°17′E
- Country: Poland
- Voivodeship: Lublin
- County: Lublin
- Gmina: Borzechów

Borzechów [bɔˈʐɛxuf] is a village in Lublin County, Lublin Voivodeship, in eastern Poland. It is the seat of the gmina (administrative district) called Gmina Borzechów.
