= Białawoda, Lublin Voivodeship =

Białawoda
- Village
- Location within Poland
- Coordinates: 51°2′1″N 22°15′55″E
- Country: Poland
- Voivodeship: Lublin
- County: Lublin
- Gmina: Borzechów

Białawoda [bjawaˈvɔda] is a village in the administrative district of Gmina Borzechów, within Lublin County, Lublin Voivodeship, in eastern Poland.
