= Gmina Garwolin =

Gmina Garwolin Garwolin Commune
- Gmina
- Flag Coat of arms
- Interactive map of Gmina Garwolin
- Coordinates (Garwolin): 51°54′N 21°38′E
- Country: Poland
- Voivodeship: Masovian
- County: Garwolin
- Seat: Garwolin

Area
  - Total: 136 km^{2} (53 sq mi)

Population (2006)
  - Total: 11,919
  - Density: 87.6/km^{2} (227/sq mi)
- Website: http://www.garwolin-gmina.pl/

Gmina Garwolin is a rural gmina (administrative district) in Garwolin County, Masovian Voivodeship, in east-central Poland. Its seat is the town of Garwolin, although the town is not part of the territory of the gmina.

The gmina covers an area of 136 square kilometres (52.5 sq mi), and as of 2006, its total population is 11,919.

== Villages ==
Gmina Garwolin contains the villages and settlements of Budy Uśniackie, Czyszkówek, Ewelin, Feliksin, Górki, Izdebnik, Jagodne, Krystyna, Lucin, Miętne, Natalia, Niecieplin, Nowy Puznów, Rębków, Rębków-Parcele, Ruda Talubska, Sławiny, Stara Huta, Stary Puznów, Stoczek, Sulbiny Górne, Taluba, Unin-Kolonia, Uśniaki, Wilkowyja, Władysławów, Wola Rębkowska, Wola Władysławowska and Zakącie.

== Neighbouring gminas ==
Gmina Garwolin is bordered by the town of Garwolin and by the gminas of Borowie, Górzno, Łaskarzew, Osieck, Parysów, Pilawa, Sobienie-Jeziory and Wilga.
