= Zakącie, Lublin Voivodeship =

Zakącie
- Village
- Location within Poland
- Coordinates: 51°51′01″N 21°31′09″E
- Country: Poland
- Voivodeship: Lublin
- County: Lublin
- Gmina: Borzechów

Zakącie [zaˈkɔnt͡ɕɛ] is a village in the administrative district of Gmina Borzechów, within Lublin County, Lublin Voivodeship, in eastern Poland.
