= Zakącie, Masovian Voivodeship =

Zakącie
- Village
- Location within Poland
- Coordinates: 51°50′58″N 21°30′30″E
- Country: Poland
- Voivodeship: Masovian
- County: Garwolin
- Gmina: Garwolin

Zakącie [zaˈkɔnt͡ɕɛ] is a village in the administrative district of Gmina Garwolin, within Garwolin County, Masovian Voivodeship, in east-central Poland.

== Climate ==
Zakącie has a warm-summer humid continental climate (Dfb) Köppen Climate Type.
