= Urszulin, Ryki County =

Village in Lublin Voivodeship, Poland

Urszulin
- Village
- Location within Poland
- Coordinates: 51°41′N 22°7′E
- Country: Poland
- Voivodeship: Lublin
- County: Ryki
- Gmina: Nowodwór
- Population (2009): 131
- Time zone: UTC+1 (CET)
  - Summer (DST): UTC+2 (CEST)
- Postal code: 08-503
- Area code: +48 81
- Car plates: LRY

Urszulin (Polish pronunciation: [urˈʂulin]) is a village in the administrative district of Gmina Nowodwór, within Ryki County, Lublin Voivodeship, in eastern Poland. As of 2009, the village had a population of 131.

In 1827, as a part of the Drążgów goods, it had 5 houses and 29 inhabitants. In 1872 it was detached from Drążgów together with Zawitała, and in 1885 it was separated from Zawitała. At the end of the 19th century it had 4 houses and 47 inhabitants.
