= Żabianka, Lublin Voivodeship =

Village in Lublin Voivodeship, Poland

Żabianka
- Village
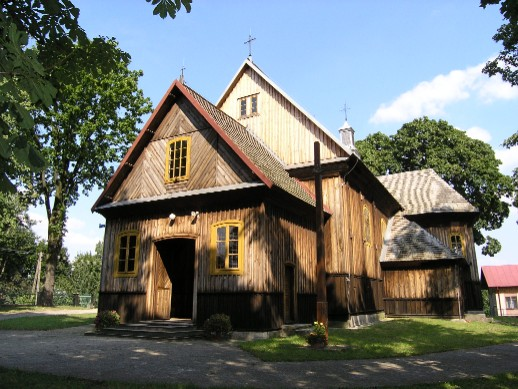
- Church of the Assumption in Żabianka

- Location within Poland
- Coordinates: 51°35′14″N 22°5′32″E
- Country: Poland
- Voivodeship: Lublin
- County: Ryki
- Gmina: Ułęż
- Elevation: 140 m (460 ft)
- Population (2011): 122
- Time zone: UTC+1 (CET)
  - Summer (DST): UTC+2 (CEST)
- Postal code: 08-504
- Area code: +48 25
- Car plates: LRY

Żabianka (Polish: [ʐaˈbjaŋka]) is a village in the administrative district of Gmina Ułęż, within Ryki County, Lublin Voivodeship, in eastern Poland. In 2011 it had a population of 122.

== History ==
The village was first known as Wola Żabia before being renamed to Żabianka. Historically, it was located within Stężyca Land, Sandomierz Voivodeship. The first mention of the village in historical record is in a tax inventory from 1569, where a man called 'Lyeczki', possibly named after the nearby village of Lendo, paid tax on one łan. In 1827 it had 12 houses and 109 inhabitants. By the end of the 19th century it had a poorhouse, 12 houses, and its population was 83.

Until the latter half of the 16th century the village belonged to the Drążgów parish. In 1570 Łukasz Lendzki, a local noble, erected a church there which, after a period of it being a filial church, was made the seat of the parish in 1575. This was because the old seat was converted into an Arian congregation. The current wooden church was built in 1754 by Feliks Bentkowski, the Stężyca Land Starosta. The church underwent renovations in 1882, 1975–1976, and 2014; during the restoration works in 2014, a burial crypt was discovered under its floor.
