= Gozd =

Gozd may refer to the following places:

- Gozd, Lublin Voivodeship (east Poland)
- Gozd, West Pomeranian Voivodeship (northwest Poland)
- Gozd, Ajdovščina, Slovenia
- Gozd, Kamnik, Slovenia
- Gozd, Tržič, Slovenia
- Gozd–Martuljek, Kranjska Gora, Slovenia (known as Gozd until 1955)

For other places in Poland, see Gózd (disambiguation).
