= Janisze, Lublin Voivodeship =

Janisze
- Village
- Location within Poland
- Coordinates: 51°38′N 22°0′E
- Country: Poland
- Voivodeship: Lublin
- County: Ryki
- Gmina: Ryki

Janisze [jaˈniʂɛ] is a village in the administrative district of Gmina Ryki, within Ryki County, Lublin Voivodeship, in eastern Poland.
