= Stryj =

Stryj may refer to:

- Stryj, Lublin Voivodeship, east Poland
- Stryi, Ukraine (Stryj in Polish)
- Stryi Raion, Ukraine
- Stryi (air base), Ukraine
- Stryi River, in Ukraine
- Zbigniew Stryj (born 1968), Polish actor

== See also ==
- Stryi (disambiguation)
