= Stara Dąbia =

- Village
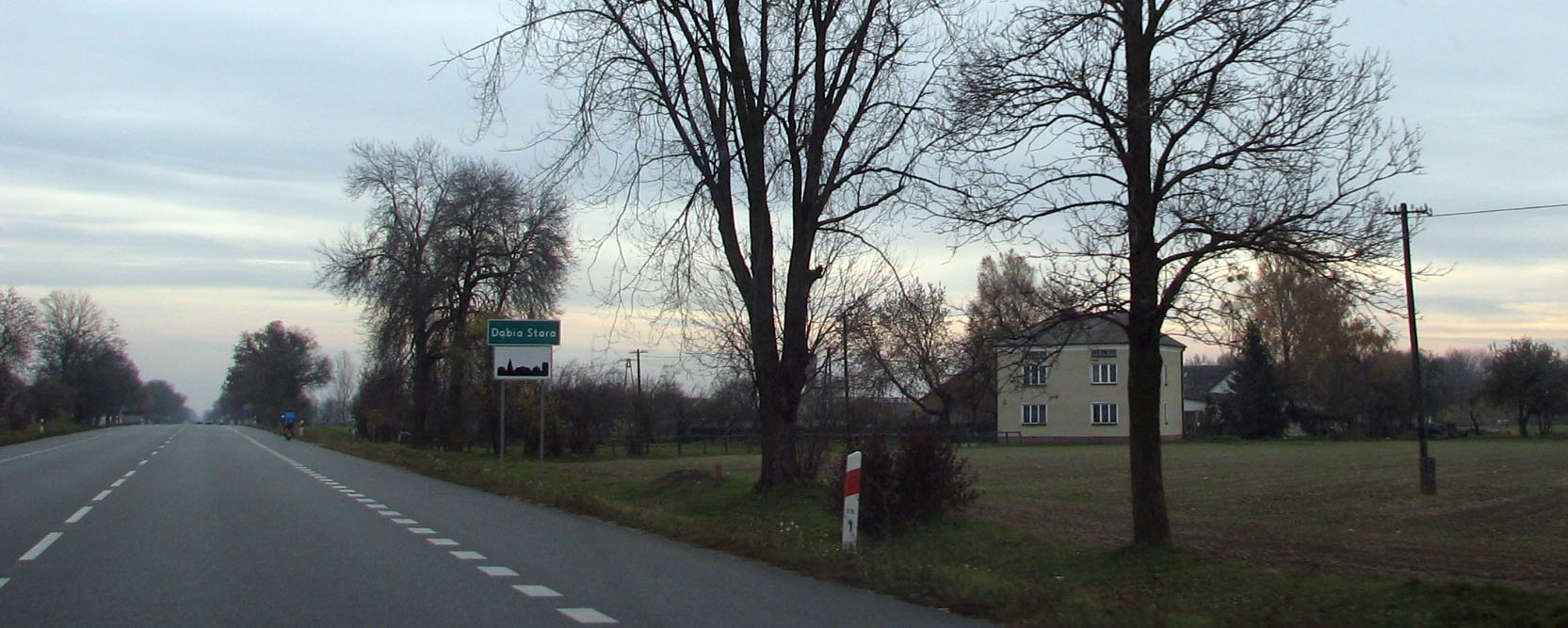

- Location within Poland
- Coordinates: 51°39′47″N 21°53′17″E
- Country: Poland
- Voivodeship: Lublin
- County: Ryki
- Gmina: Ryki
- Population: 132 (2,015)

Stara Dąbia [ˈstara ˈdɔmbja] is a village in the administrative district of Gmina Ryki, within Ryki County, Lublin Voivodeship, in eastern Poland.
