= Zosin, Ryki County =

Zosin
- Village
- Location within Poland
- Coordinates: 51°37′N 22°8′E
- Country: Poland
- Voivodeship: Lublin
- County: Ryki
- Gmina: Ułęż

Zosin [ˈzɔɕin] is a village in the administrative district of Gmina Ułęż, within Ryki County, Lublin Voivodeship, in eastern Poland.
