= Nowa Dąbia =

- Village
- Location within Poland
- Coordinates: 51°39′13″N 21°54′22″E
- Country: Poland
- Voivodeship: Lublin
- County: Ryki
- Gmina: Ryki

Nowa Dąbia [ˈnɔva ˈdɔmbja] is a village in the administrative district of Gmina Ryki, within Ryki County, Lublin Voivodeship, in eastern Poland.
