= Kawęczyn, Ryki County =

Kawęczyn
- Village
- Location within Poland
- Coordinates: 51°43′N 22°0′E
- Country: Poland
- Voivodeship: Lublin
- County: Ryki
- Gmina: Kłoczew

Kawęczyn [kaˈvɛnt͡ʂɨn] is a village in the administrative district of Gmina Kłoczew, within Ryki County, Lublin Voivodeship, in eastern Poland.
