= Kokoszka, Lublin Voivodeship =

Kokoszka
- Village
- Location within Poland
- Coordinates: 51°45′N 22°3′E
- Country: Poland
- Voivodeship: Lublin
- County: Ryki
- Gmina: Kłoczew
- Population: 160

Kokoszka [kɔˈkɔʂka] is a village in the administrative district of Gmina Kłoczew, within Ryki County, Lublin Voivodeship, in eastern Poland.
