= Sosnówka, Ryki County =

Sosnówka
- Village
- Location within Poland
- Coordinates: 51°44′24″N 21°58′47″E
- Country: Poland
- Voivodeship: Lublin
- County: Ryki
- Gmina: Kłoczew
- Population: 140

Sosnówka [sɔsˈnufka] is a village in the administrative district of Gmina Kłoczew, within Ryki County, Lublin Voivodeship, in eastern Poland.

In 2005 the village had a population of 140.
