= Swaty =

- Village
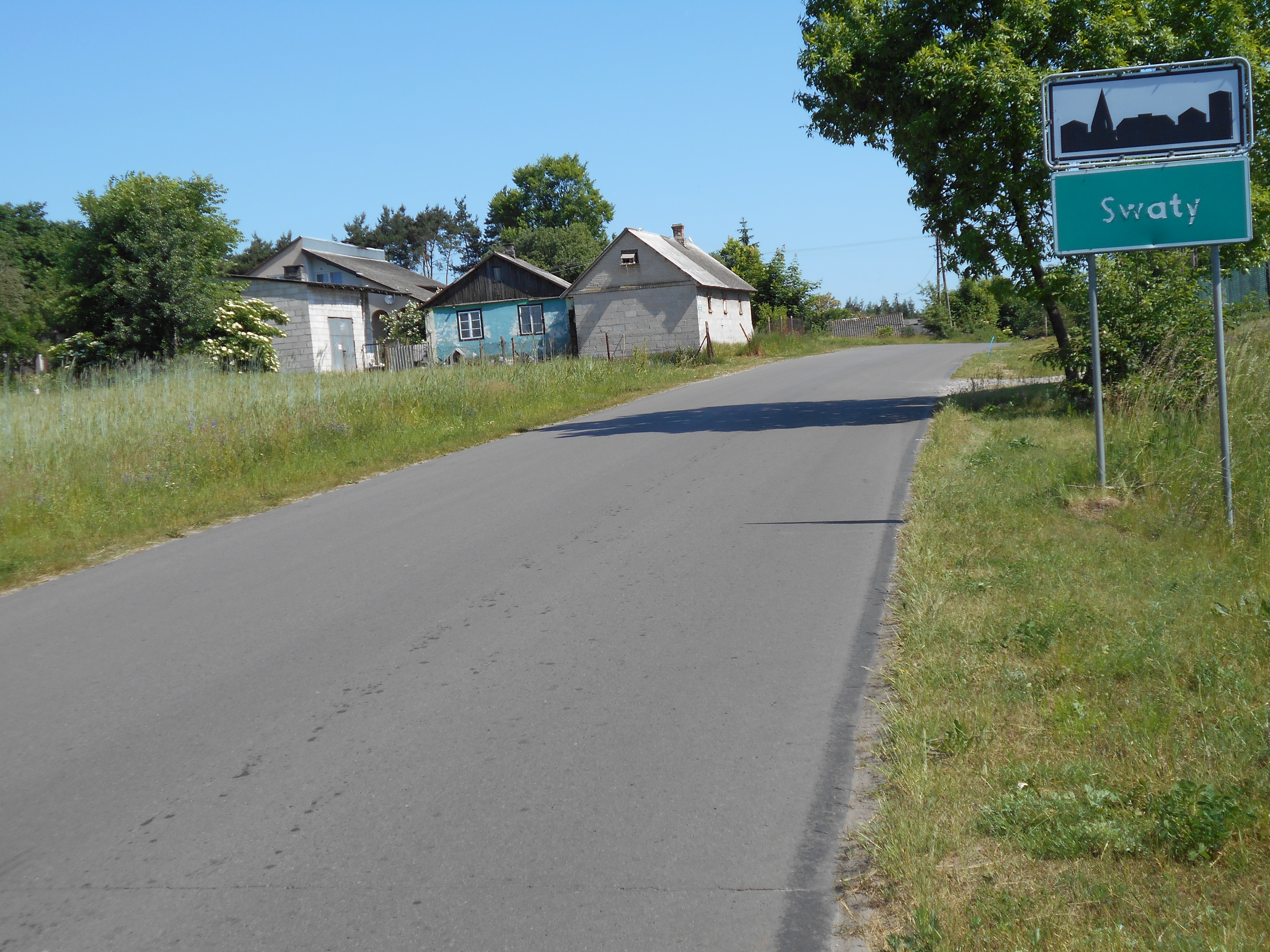

- Location within Poland
- Coordinates: 51°38′N 21°54′E
- Country: Poland
- Voivodeship: Lublin
- County: Ryki
- Gmina: Ryki
- Population: 1,000

Swaty [ˈsfatɨ] is a village in the administrative district of Gmina Ryki, within Ryki County, Lublin Voivodeship, in eastern Poland.
