= Jakubówka, Lublin Voivodeship =

Jakubówka
- Village
- Location within Poland
- Coordinates: 51°39′N 22°3′E
- Country: Poland
- Voivodeship: Lublin
- County: Ryki
- Gmina: Nowodwór

Jakubówka [jakuˈbufka] is a village in the administrative district of Gmina Nowodwór, within Ryki County, Lublin Voivodeship, in eastern Poland.
