= Chudów, Lublin Voivodeship =

Chudów
- Village
- Location within Poland
- Coordinates: 51°40′30″N 22°03′32″E
- Country: Poland
- Voivodeship: Lublin
- County: Ryki
- Gmina: Ryki

Chudów [ˈxuduf] is a village in the administrative district of Gmina Ryki, within Ryki County, Lublin Voivodeship, in eastern Poland.
