= Kazimierzyn =

- Village
- Location within Poland
- Coordinates: 51°38′48″N 21°53′56″E
- Country: Poland
- Voivodeship: Lublin
- County: Ryki
- Gmina: Ryki
- Population: 30

Kazimierzyn [kaʑiˈmjɛʐɨn] is a village in the administrative district of Gmina Ryki, within Ryki County, Lublin Voivodeship, in eastern Poland.
