= Edwardów, Ryki County =

Edwardów
- Village
- Location within Poland
- Coordinates: 51°40′N 21°52′E
- Country: Poland
- Voivodeship: Lublin
- County: Ryki
- Gmina: Ryki

Edwardów [ɛdˈvarduf] is a village in the administrative district of Gmina Ryki, within Ryki County, Lublin Voivodeship, in eastern Poland.
