= Podlodów, Ryki County =

Podlodów
- Village
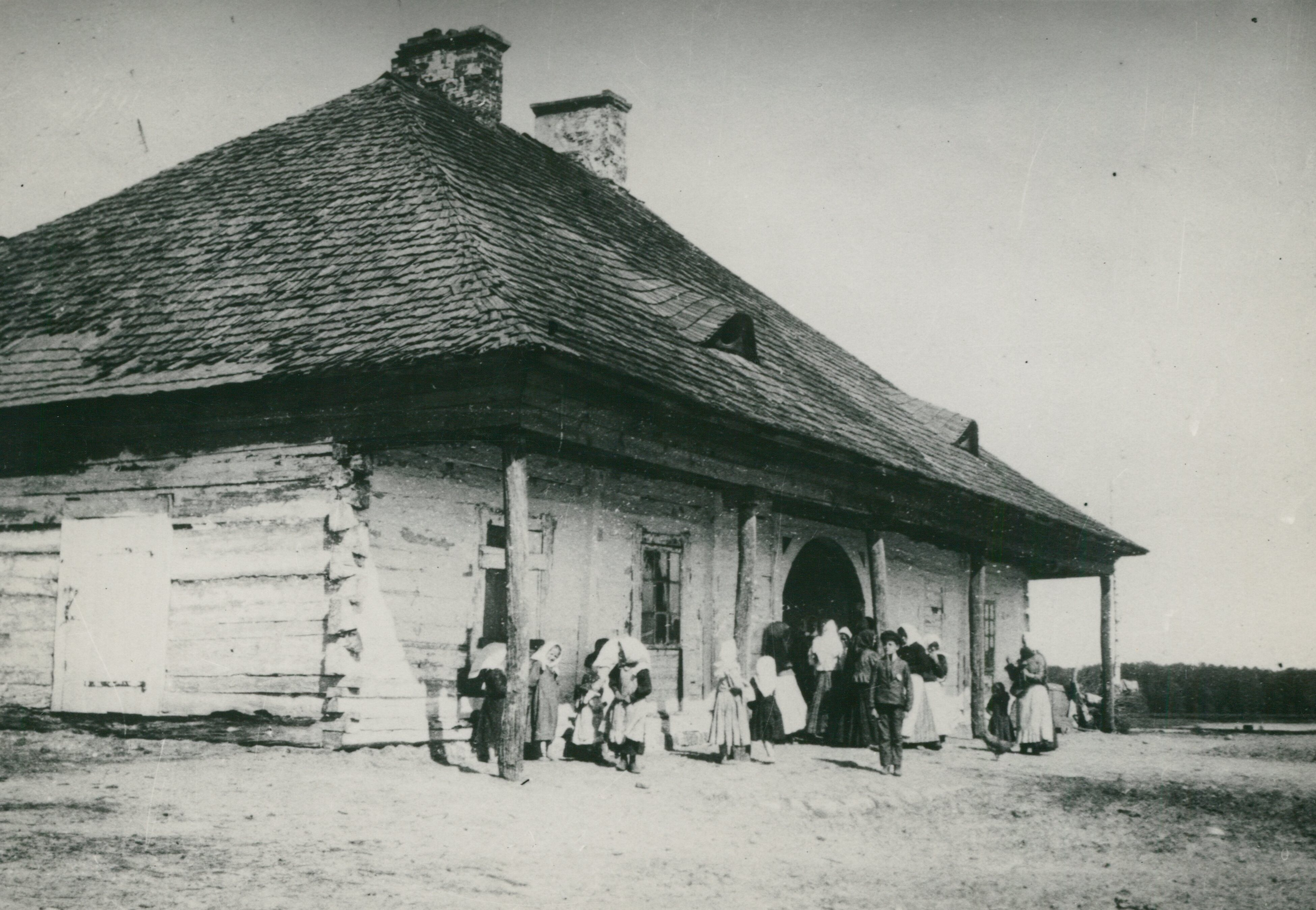
- Inn in Podlodów, ca 1915

- Location within Poland
- Coordinates: 51°36′49″N 22°11′16″E
- Country: Poland
- Voivodeship: Lublin
- County: Ryki
- Gmina: Ułęż
- Time zone: UTC+1 (CET)
  - Summer (DST): UTC+2 (CEST)
- Vehicle registration: LRY

Podlodów [pɔdˈlɔduf] is a village in the administrative district of Gmina Ułęż, within Ryki County, Lublin Voivodeship, in eastern Poland.
