= Grabowce Górne =

- Village
- Location within Poland
- Coordinates: 51°38′N 22°7′E
- Country: Poland
- Voivodeship: Lublin
- County: Ryki
- Gmina: Nowodwór

Grabowce Górne [ɡraˈbɔft͡sɛ ˈɡurnɛ] is a village in the administrative district of Gmina Nowodwór, within Ryki County, Lublin Voivodeship, in eastern Poland.
