= Przestrzeń, Lublin Voivodeship =

Przestrzeń
- Village
- Location within Poland
- Coordinates: 51°38′32″N 22°08′20″E
- Country: Poland
- Voivodeship: Lublin
- County: Ryki
- Gmina: Nowodwór

Przestrzeń [ˈpʂɛstʂɛɲ] is a village in the administrative district of Gmina Nowodwór, within Ryki County, Lublin Voivodeship, in eastern Poland.
