= Kleszczówka =

- Village
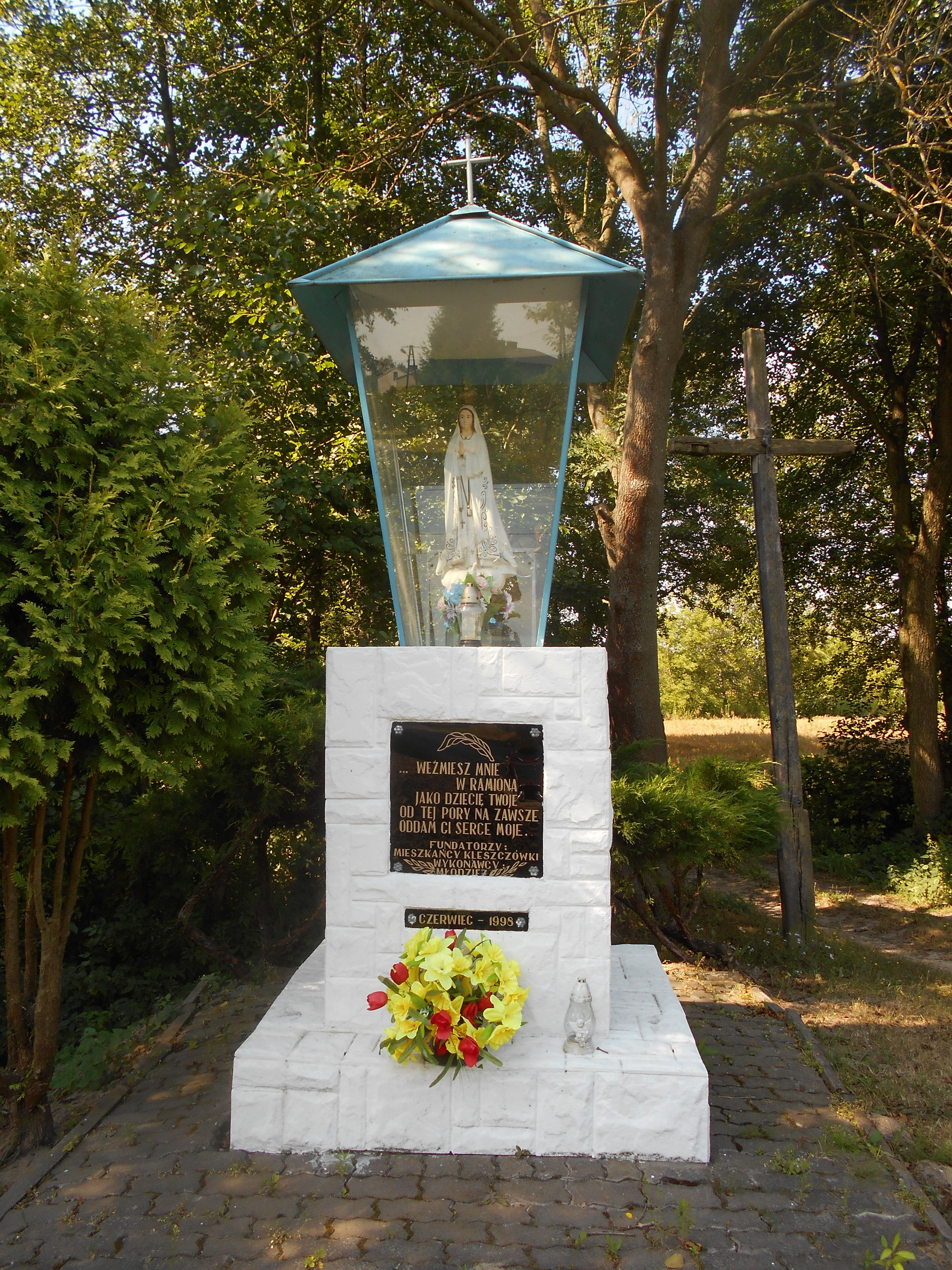
- Wayside shrine in Kleszczówka

- Location within Poland
- Coordinates: 51°35′N 21°55′E
- Country: Poland
- Voivodeship: Lublin
- County: Ryki
- Gmina: Ryki
- Time zone: UTC+1 (CET)
  - Summer (DST): UTC+2 (CEST)

Kleszczówka [klɛʂˈt͡ʂufka] is a village in the administrative district of Gmina Ryki, within Ryki County, Lublin Voivodeship, in eastern Poland.

== History ==
Seven Polish citizens were murdered by Nazi Germany in the village during World War II.
