= Czernic =

- Village
- Location within Poland
- Coordinates: 51°42′N 22°0′E
- Country: Poland
- Voivodeship: Lublin
- County: Ryki
- Gmina: Kłoczew
- Website: http://czernic.republika.pl/

Czernic [ˈt͡ʂɛrnit͡s] is a village in the administrative district of Gmina Kłoczew, within Ryki County, Lublin Voivodeship, in eastern Poland.
