= Nowodwór, Ryki County =

Village in Lublin Voivodeship, Poland

Nowodwór
- Village
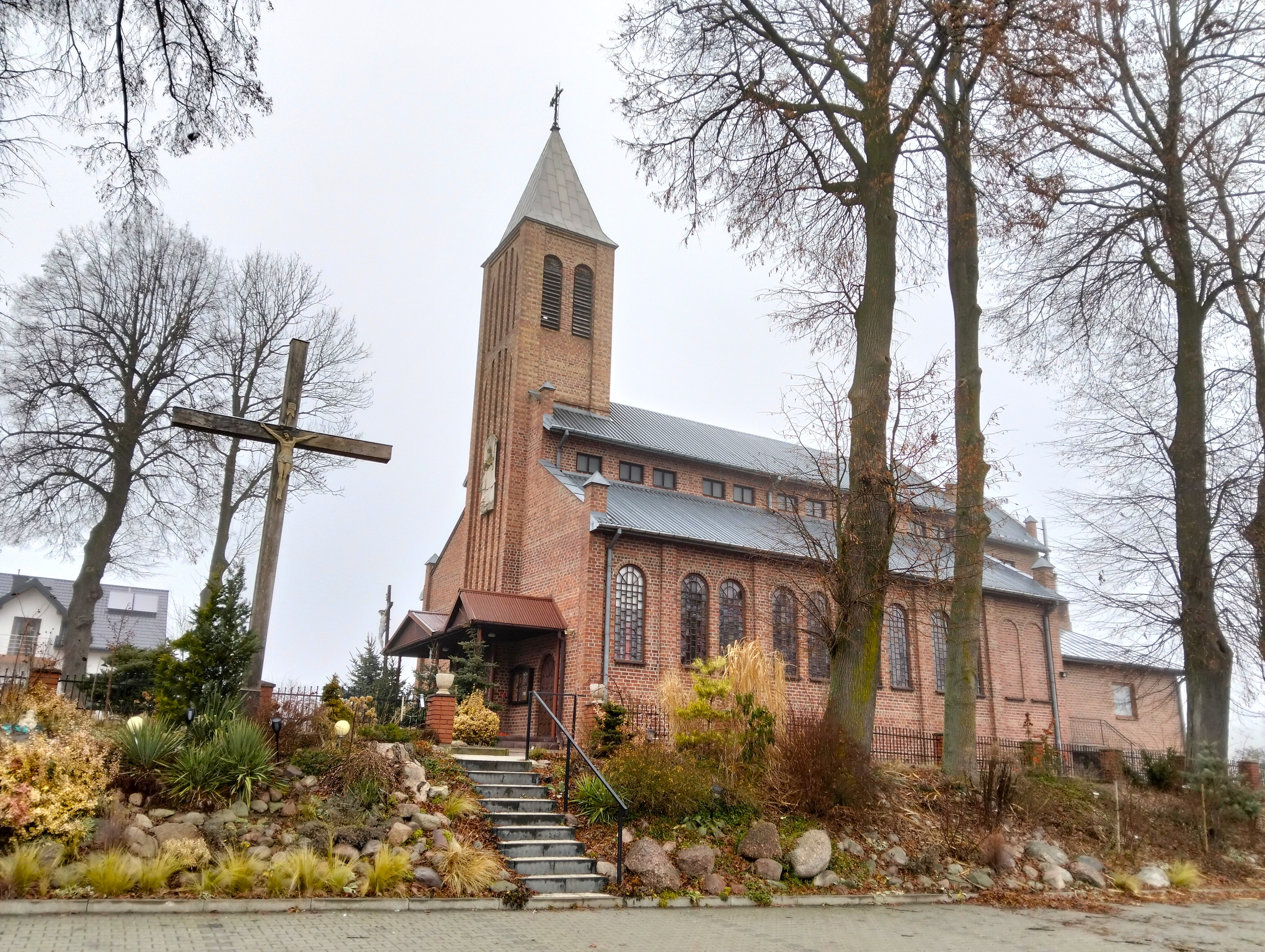

- Location within Poland
- Coordinates: 51°38′33″N 22°5′59″E
- Country: Poland
- Voivodeship: Lublin
- County: Ryki
- Gmina: Nowodwór
- Elevation: 159 m (522 ft)

Population (2011)
  - Total: 534
- Time zone: UTC+1 (CET)
  - Summer (DST): UTC+2 (CEST)
- Postal code: 08-503
- Area code: +48 81
- Vehicle registration: LRY

Nowodwór (Polish: [nɔˈvɔdvur]) is a village in Ryki County, Lublin Voivodeship, in eastern Poland. It is the seat of the gmina (administrative district) called Gmina Nowodwór.

== History ==
Nowodwór was first established as a town in 1556 on the site of a village called Wyprzędów. During the time of the Polish-Lithuanian Commonwealth it belonged to Stężyca Land in Sandomierz Voivodeship in the Lesser Poland Province. In 1566 it was a private town belonging to Wojciech Męciński. Tax records show that in 1569 it had two mater mills and its residents included smiths and brewers. In 1612, a parish church was built there. Sometime before 1659, it became the property of the Jesuit College in Kraków. During the Swedish Deluge it was greatly damaged by the troops of Bogusław Radziwiłł. In 1661, it had 27 houses and in 1664 it had 109 inhabitants. In 1791 there were 159 residents. Nowodwór lost its town rights in 1820. By the end of the 19th century it had 26 houses, 262 inhabitants, a water mill, a lumber mill, and a fulling mill.

Six Polish citizens were murdered by Nazi Germany in the village during World War II.
