= Zalesie-Kolonia, Lublin Voivodeship =

Zalesie-Kolonia
- Village
- Location within Poland
- Coordinates: 51°39′35″N 21°57′30″E
- Country: Poland
- Voivodeship: Lublin
- County: Ryki
- Gmina: Ryki
- Population: 110

Zalesie-Kolonia [zaˈlɛɕɛ kɔˈlɔɲa] is a village in the administrative district of Gmina Ryki, within Ryki County, Lublin Voivodeship, in eastern Poland.
