= Julianów, Ryki County =

Julianów
- Village
- Location within Poland
- Coordinates: 51°43′N 21°58′E
- Country: Poland
- Voivodeship: Lublin
- County: Ryki
- Gmina: Kłoczew

Julianów [juˈljanuf] is a village in the administrative district of Gmina Kłoczew, within Ryki County, Lublin Voivodeship, in eastern Poland.
