= Zaryte =

- Village
- Location within Poland
- Coordinates: 51°44′N 21°55′E
- Country: Poland
- Voivodeship: Lublin
- County: Ryki
- Gmina: Kłoczew
- Time zone: UTC+1 (CET)
  - Summer (DST): UTC+2 (CEST)

"Zaryte" is also the name of part of the town of Rabka-Zdrój.

Zaryte [zaˈrɨtɛ] is a village in the administrative district of Gmina Kłoczew, within Ryki County, Lublin Voivodeship, in eastern Poland.

== History ==
Six Polish citizens were murdered by Nazi Germany in the village during World War II.
