= Grabowce Dolne =

- Village
- Location within Poland
- Coordinates: 51°38′N 22°8′E
- Country: Poland
- Voivodeship: Lublin
- County: Ryki
- Gmina: Nowodwór

Population (approx.)
  - Total: 150
- Time zone: UTC+1 (CET)
  - Summer (DST): UTC+2 (CEST)

Grabowce Dolne [ɡraˈbɔft͡sɛ ˈdɔlnɛ] is a village in the administrative district of Gmina Nowodwór, within Ryki County, Lublin Voivodeship, in eastern Poland.

== History ==
Four Polish citizens were murdered by Nazi Germany in the village during World War II.
