= Zawitała =

Village in Lublin Voivodeship, Poland

- Village
- Location within Poland
- Coordinates: 51°41′N 22°8′E
- Country: Poland
- Voivodeship: Lublin
- County: Ryki
- Gmina: Nowodwór

Population (2011)
  - Total: 403
- Time zone: UTC+1 (CET)
  - Summer (DST): UTC+2 (CEST)
- Postal code: 08-503
- Area code: +48 81
- Car plates: LRY

Zawitała (Polish: [zaviˈtawa]) is a village in the administrative district of Gmina Nowodwór, within Ryki County, Lublin Voivodeship, in eastern Poland.

== History ==
Historically, it was a part of Stężyca Land in the Sandomierz Voivodeship. In the 16th century it was the property of Mikołaj Kłoczowski, a local land official. In 1827, as a part of Drążgów goods, it had 20 houses and 136 inhabitants. By the end of the 19th century it had 23 houses and 151 inhabitants.

Six Polish citizens were murdered by Nazi Germany in the village during World War II.
