= Stary Bazanów =

- Village
- Location within Poland
- Coordinates: 51°37′38″N 22°01′12″E
- Country: Poland
- Voivodeship: Lublin
- County: Ryki
- Gmina: Ryki
- Population: 570

Stary Bazanów [ˈstarɨ baˈzanuf] is a village in the administrative district of Gmina Ryki, within Ryki County, Lublin Voivodeship, in eastern Poland.
