= Potok, Lublin Voivodeship =

Potok
- Village
- Location within Poland
- Coordinates: 51°41′N 21°57′E
- Country: Poland
- Voivodeship: Lublin
- County: Ryki
- Gmina: Ryki

Potok [ˈpɔtɔk] is a village in the administrative district of Gmina Ryki, within Ryki County, Lublin Voivodeship, in eastern Poland.
