= Wola Zadybska =

- Village
- Location within Poland
- Coordinates: 51°44′48″N 21°51′41″E
- Country: Poland
- Voivodeship: Lublin
- County: Ryki
- Gmina: Kłoczew
- Population: 340

Wola Zadybska [ˈvɔla zaˈdɨpska] is a village in the administrative district of Gmina Kłoczew, within Ryki County, Lublin Voivodeship, in eastern Poland.
