= Jagodne, Ryki County =

Jagodne
- Village
- Location within Poland
- Coordinates: 51°44′36″N 22°0′37″E
- Country: Poland
- Voivodeship: Lublin
- County: Ryki
- Gmina: Kłoczew
- Population: 64

Jagodne [jaˈɡɔdnɛ] is a village in the administrative district of Gmina Kłoczew, within Ryki County, Lublin Voivodeship, in eastern Poland.
