= Grabów Szlachecki =

- Village
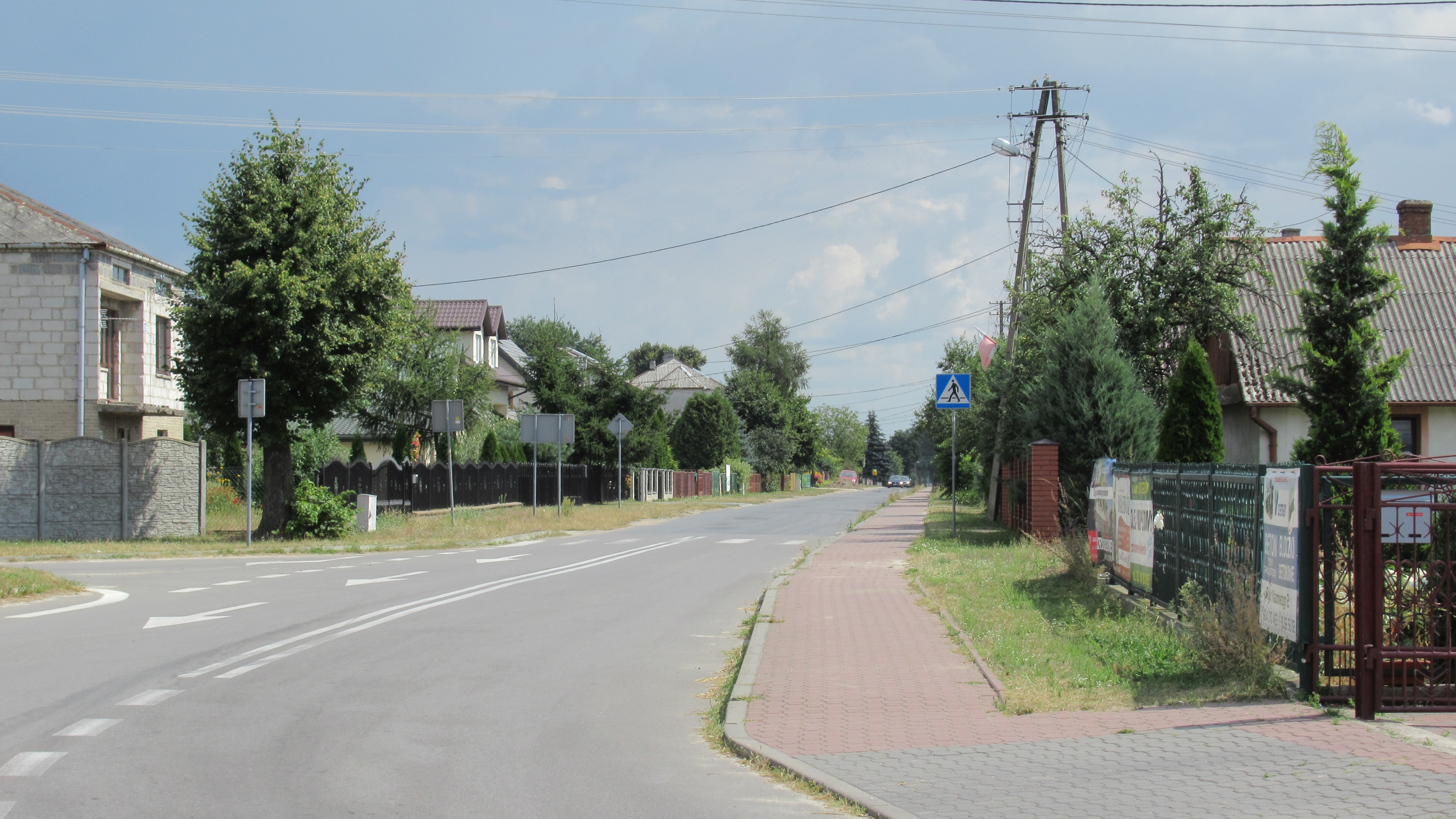

- Location within Poland
- Coordinates: 51°42′1″N 22°5′52″E
- Country: Poland
- Voivodeship: Lublin
- County: Ryki
- Gmina: Nowodwór

Population
  - Total: 930
- Time zone: UTC+1 (CET)
  - Summer (DST): UTC+2 (CEST)

Grabów Szlachecki (Polish pronunciation: [ˈɡrabuf ʂlaˈxɛtskʲi]) is a village in the administrative district of Gmina Nowodwór, within Ryki County, Lublin Voivodeship, in eastern Poland.

== History ==
Six Polish citizens were murdered by Nazi Germany in the village during World War II.
