= Brusów =

- Village
- Location within Poland
- Coordinates: 51°38′N 22°1′E
- Country: Poland
- Voivodeship: Lublin
- County: Ryki
- Gmina: Ryki

Brusów [ˈbrusuf] is a village in the administrative district of Gmina Ryki, within Ryki County, Lublin Voivodeship, in eastern Poland.

== Economy ==
The economy of Brusów is primarily based on agriculture.
