= Bramka =

Bramka may refer to the following places:

- Bramka, Kuyavian-Pomeranian Voivodeship (north-central Poland)
- Bramka, Lublin Voivodeship (east Poland)
- Bramka, Warmian-Masurian Voivodeship (north Poland)
