= Grabów Rycki =

- Village
- Location within Poland
- Coordinates: 51°41′N 22°6′E
- Country: Poland
- Voivodeship: Lublin
- County: Ryki
- Gmina: Nowodwór

Grabów Rycki [ˈɡrabuf ˈrɨt͡ski] is a village in the administrative district of Gmina Nowodwór, within Ryki County, Lublin Voivodeship, in eastern Poland.
