= Stare Zadybie =

- Village
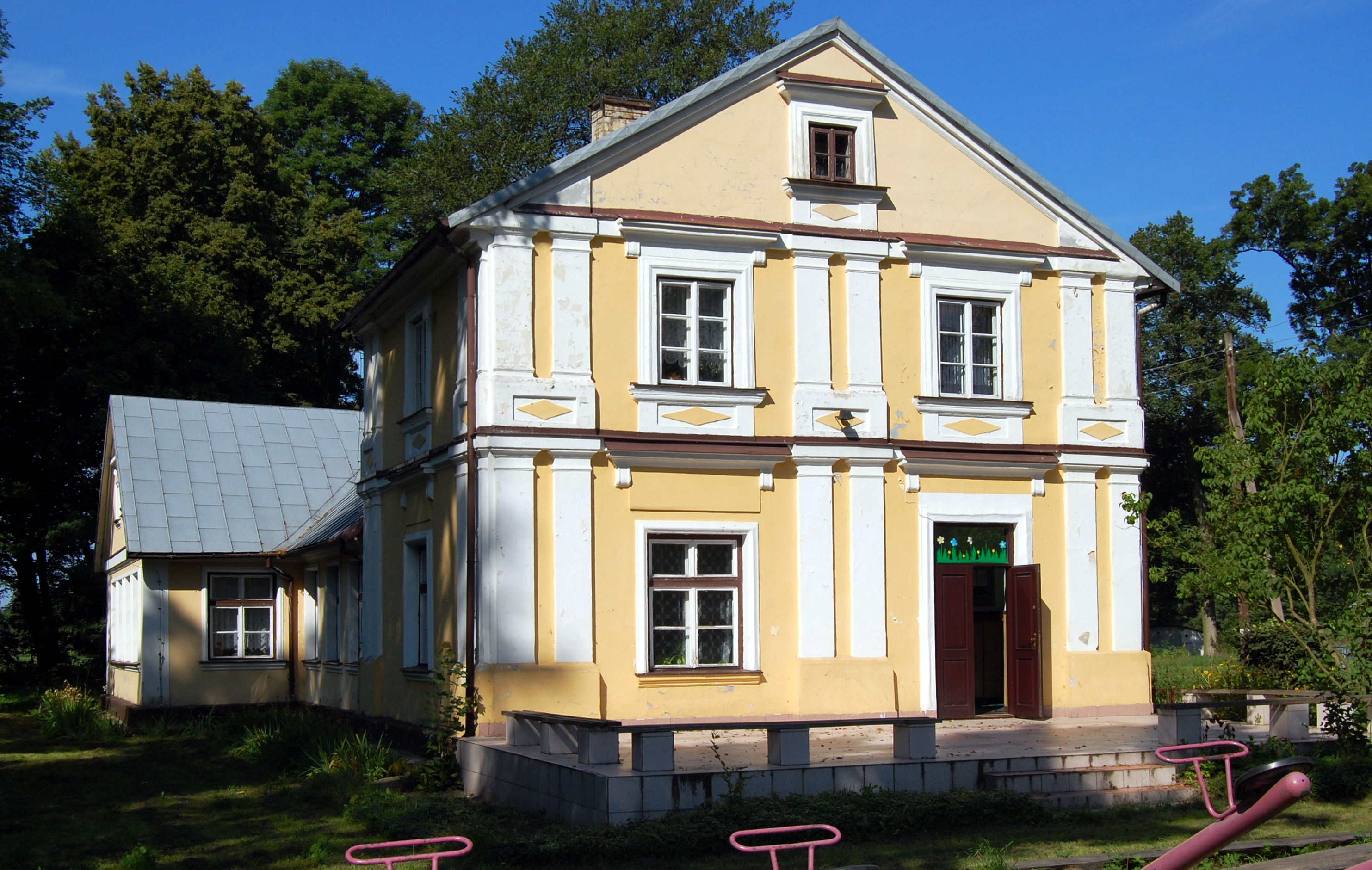
- Stare Zadybie manor house

- Location within Poland
- Coordinates: 51°46′N 21°56′E
- Country: Poland
- Voivodeship: Lublin
- County: Ryki
- Gmina: Kłoczew
- Time zone: UTC+1 (CET)
  - Summer (DST): UTC+2 (CEST)

Stare Zadybie [ˈstarɛ zaˈdɨbjɛ] is a village in the administrative district of Gmina Kłoczew, within Ryki County, Lublin Voivodeship, in eastern Poland.

== History ==
Four Polish citizens were murdered by Nazi Germany in the village during World War II.
