= Zalesie, Ryki County =

Zalesie
- Village
- Location within Poland
- Coordinates: 51°40′N 21°57′E
- Country: Poland
- Voivodeship: Lublin
- County: Ryki
- Gmina: Ryki
- Population (approx.): 350

Zalesie [zaˈlɛɕɛ] is a village in the administrative district of Gmina Ryki, within Ryki County, Lublin Voivodeship, in eastern Poland.
