= Karczmiska, Ryki County =

Karczmiska
- Village
- Location within Poland
- Coordinates: 51°40′8″N 22°0′27″E
- Country: Poland
- Voivodeship: Lublin
- County: Ryki
- Gmina: Ryki

Population
  - Total: 640
- Time zone: UTC+1 (CET)
  - Summer (DST): UTC+2 (CEST)

Karczmiska [kart͡ʂˈmiska] is a village in the administrative district of Gmina Ryki, within Ryki County, Lublin Voivodeship, in eastern Poland.

== History ==
11 Polish citizens were murdered by Nazi Germany in the village during World War II.
