= Trzcianki, Ryki County =

Trzcianki
- Village
- Location within Poland
- Coordinates: 51°37′03″N 22°03′28″E
- Country: Poland
- Voivodeship: Lublin
- County: Ryki
- Gmina: Nowodwór

Trzcianki [ˈtʂt͡ɕaŋki] is a village in the administrative district of Gmina Nowodwór, within Ryki County, Lublin Voivodeship, in eastern Poland.
