= Przykwa =

- Village
- Location within Poland
- Coordinates: 51°42′N 21°58′E
- Country: Poland
- Voivodeship: Lublin
- County: Ryki
- Gmina: Kłoczew

Przykwa [ˈpʂɨkfa] is a village in the administrative district of Gmina Kłoczew, within Ryki County, Lublin Voivodeship, in eastern Poland.
