= Sokola =

Sokola may refer to the following:

== People ==
- David Sokola (born July 28, 1955), American politician

== Places ==
- Sokola, Lower Silesian Voivodeship (south-west Poland)
- Sokola, Lublin Voivodeship (east Poland)
- Sokola Dąbrowa, village in Lubusz Voivodeship
- Sokola Góra, Zgierz County, village in Łódź Voivodeship
- Sokola Góra, Radomsko County, village in Łódź Voivodeship

== Other ==
- Sokola coat of arms, a Polish Coat of Arms
