= Gmina Kłoczew =

Gmina Kłoczew Kłoczew Commune
- Gmina
- Flag Coat of arms

- Location within Poland
- Coordinates (Kłoczew): 51°43′21″N 21°57′36″E
- Country: Poland
- Voivodeship: Lublin
- County: Ryki
- Seat: Kłoczew

Area
  - Total: 143.17 km^{2} (55.28 sq mi)

Population (2006)
  - Total: 7,336
  - Density: 51.24/km^{2} (132.7/sq mi)

Gmina Kłoczew is a rural gmina (administrative district) in Ryki County, Lublin Voivodeship, in eastern Poland. Its seat is the village of Kłoczew, which lies approximately 11 kilometres (7 mi) north of Ryki and 68 km (42 mi) north-west of the regional capital Lublin.

The gmina covers an area of 143.17 square kilometres (55.3 sq mi), and as of 2006 its total population is 7,336.

== Villages ==
Gmina Kłoczew contains the villages and settlements of Borucicha, Bramka, Czernic, Gęsia Wólka, Gozd, Huta Zadybska, Jagodne, Janopol, Julianów, Kąty, Kawęczyn, Kłoczew, Kokoszka, Kurzelaty, Nowe Zadybie, Padarz, Przykwa, Rybaki, Rzyczyna, Sokola, Sosnówka, Stare Zadybie, Stryj, Wola Zadybska, Wola Zadybska-Kolonia, Wygranka, Wylezin and Zaryte.

== Neighbouring gminas ==
Gmina Kłoczew is bordered by the gminas of Krzywda, Nowodwór, Ryki, Trojanów, Wola Mysłowska and Żelechów.
