= Oszczywilk, Lublin Voivodeship =

Oszczywilk
- Village
- Location within Poland
- Coordinates: 51°39′N 22°0′E
- Country: Poland
- Voivodeship: Lublin
- County: Ryki
- Gmina: Ryki

Oszczywilk ([ɔʂˈt͡ʂɨvilk]) is a village in the administrative district of Gmina Ryki, within Ryki County, Lublin Voivodeship, in eastern Poland.
