= Kruków, Lublin Voivodeship =

Kruków
- Village
- Location within Poland
- Coordinates: 51°40′58″N 22°0′9″E
- Country: Poland
- Voivodeship: Lublin
- County: Ryki
- Gmina: Ryki
- Population: 40

Kruków [ˈkrukuf] is a village in the administrative district of Gmina Ryki, within Ryki County, Lublin Voivodeship, in eastern Poland.
