= Niwa Babicka =

- Village
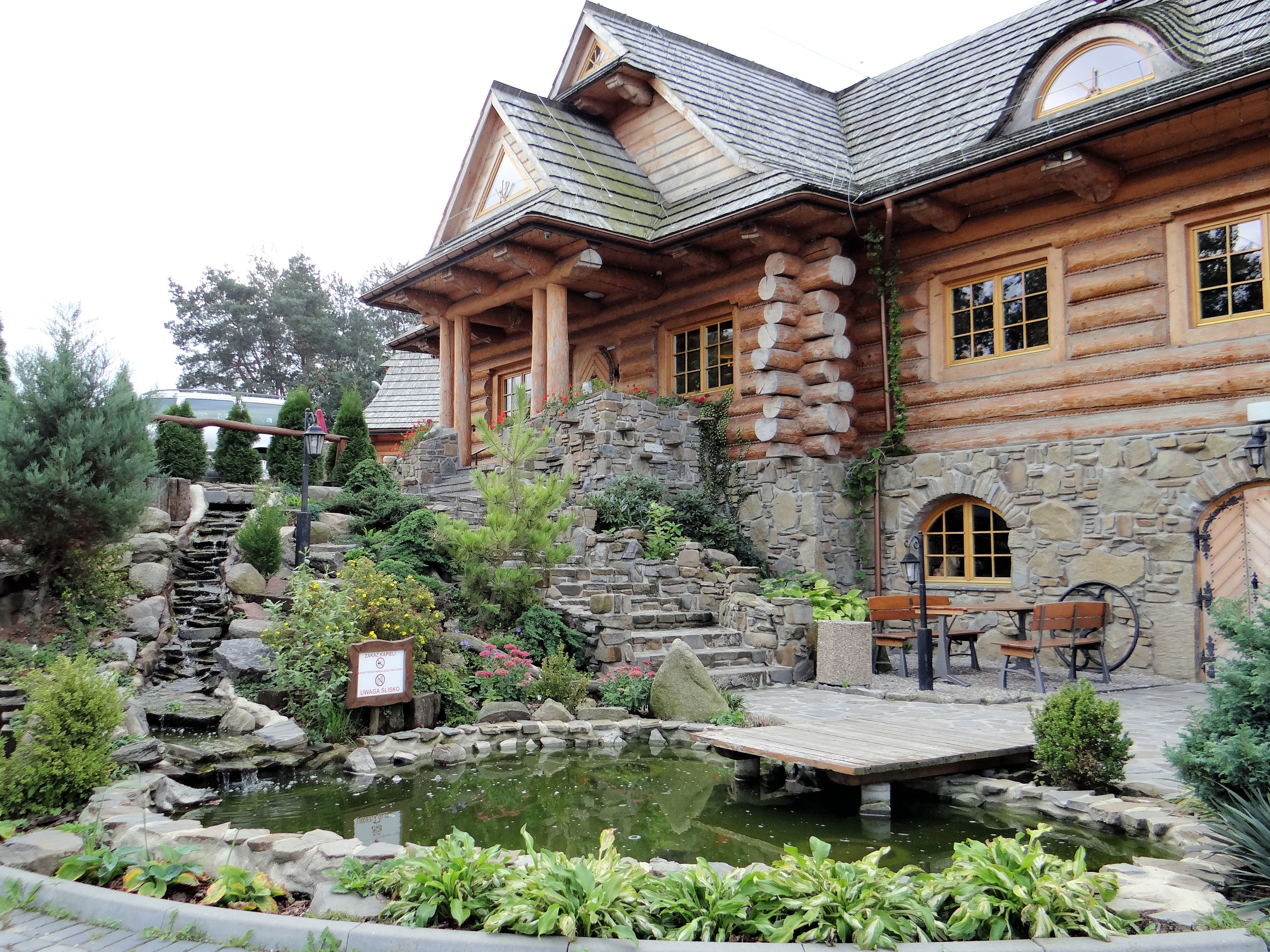
- Inn in Niwa Babicka

- Location within Poland
- Coordinates: 51°40′N 21°52′E
- Country: Poland
- Voivodeship: Lublin
- County: Ryki
- Gmina: Ryki
- Time zone: UTC+1 (CET)
  - Summer (DST): UTC+2 (CEST)

Niwa Babicka [ˈniva baˈbit͡ska] is a village in the administrative district of Gmina Ryki, within Ryki County, Lublin Voivodeship, in eastern Poland.

== History ==
Eight Polish citizens were murdered by Nazi Germany in the village during World War II.
