= Nowe Zadybie =

- Village
- Location within Poland
- Coordinates: 51°46′20″N 21°54′33″E
- Country: Poland
- Voivodeship: Lublin
- County: Ryki
- Gmina: Kłoczew

Nowe Zadybie [ˈnɔvɛ zaˈdɨbjɛ] is a village in the administrative district of Gmina Kłoczew, within Ryki County, Lublin Voivodeship, in eastern Poland.
