= Borki, Ryki County =

Borki
- Village
- Location within Poland
- Coordinates: 51°39′36″N 22°06′11″E
- Country: Poland
- Voivodeship: Lublin
- County: Ryki
- Gmina: Nowodwór

Borki [ˈbɔrki] is a village in the administrative district of Gmina Nowodwór, within Ryki County, Lublin Voivodeship, in eastern Poland.
