= Rybaki, Ryki County =

Rybaki
- Village
- Location within Poland
- Coordinates: 51°44′03″N 21°53′10″E
- Country: Poland
- Voivodeship: Lublin
- County: Ryki
- Gmina: Kłoczew

Rybaki [rɨˈbaki] is a village in the administrative district of Gmina Kłoczew, within Ryki County, Lublin Voivodeship, in eastern Poland.
