= Sarny, Lublin Voivodeship =

Sarny
- Village
- Location within Poland
- Coordinates: 51°35′N 22°1′E
- Country: Poland
- Voivodeship: Lublin
- County: Ryki
- Gmina: Ułęż

Sarny [ˈsarnɨ] is a village in the administrative district of Gmina Ułęż, within Ryki County, Lublin Voivodeship, in eastern Poland.
