= Niedźwiedź, Lublin Voivodeship =

Niedźwiedź
- Village
- Location within Poland
- Coordinates: 51°40′10″N 22°08′59″E
- Country: Poland
- Voivodeship: Lublin
- County: Ryki
- Gmina: Nowodwór

Niedźwiedź [ˈɲɛd͡ʑvjɛt͡ɕ] is a village in the administrative district of Gmina Nowodwór, within Ryki County, Lublin Voivodeship, in eastern Poland.
