= Rzyczyna =

- Village
- Location within Poland
- Coordinates: 51°43′N 22°5′E
- Country: Poland
- Voivodeship: Lublin
- County: Ryki
- Gmina: Kłoczew
- Time zone: UTC+1 (CET)
  - Summer (DST): UTC+2 (CEST)

Rzyczyna [ʐɨˈt͡ʂɨna] is a village in the administrative district of Gmina Kłoczew, within Ryki County, Lublin Voivodeship, in eastern Poland.

== History ==
11 Polish citizens were murdered by Nazi Germany in the village during World War II.
