= Nowy Bazanów =

- Village
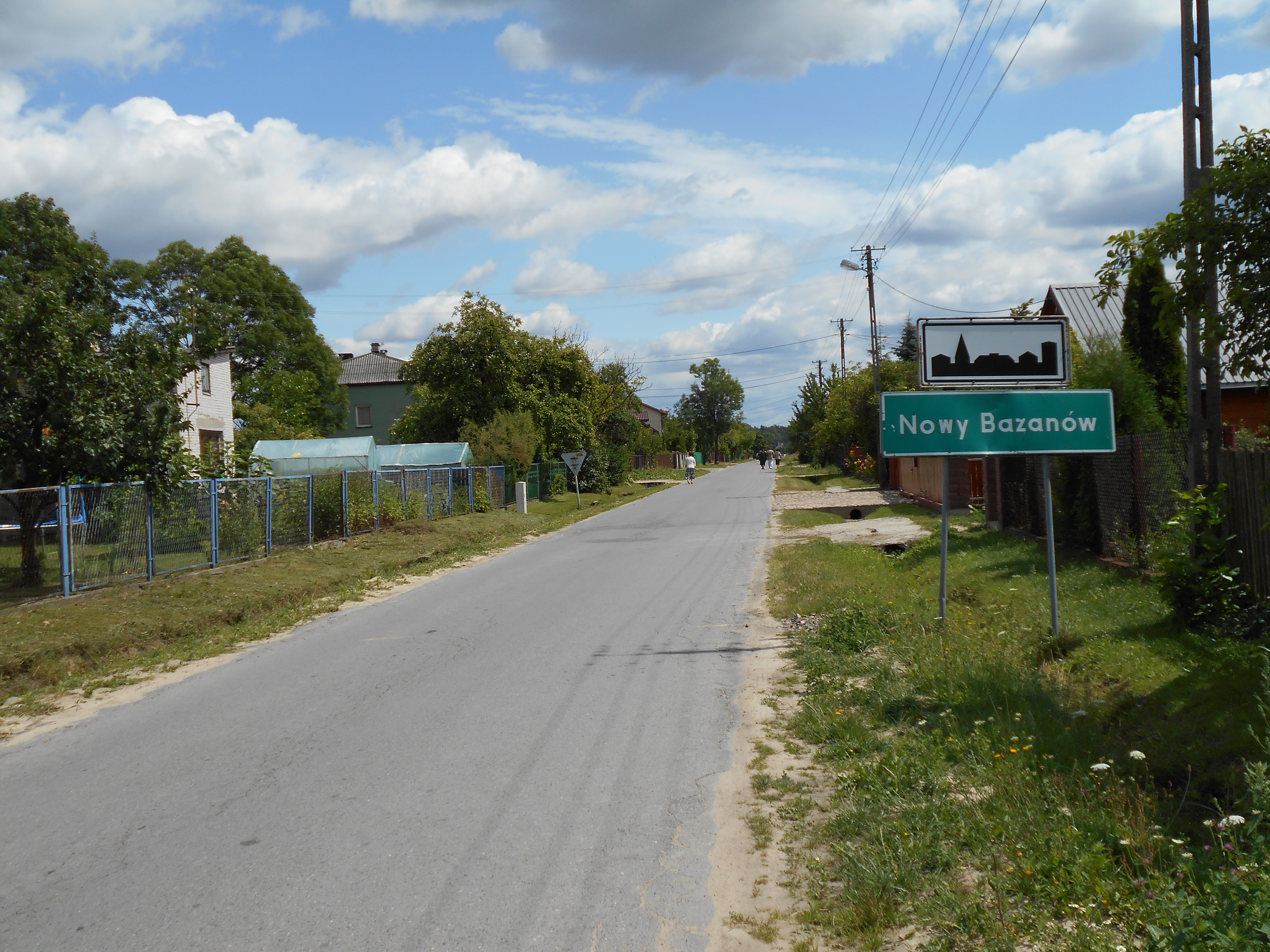

- Location within Poland
- Coordinates: 51°37′41″N 22°01′34″E
- Country: Poland
- Voivodeship: Lublin
- County: Ryki
- Gmina: Ryki
- Population: 400

Nowy Bazanów [ˈnɔvɨ baˈzanuf] is a village in the administrative district of Gmina Ryki, within Ryki County, Lublin Voivodeship, in eastern Poland.
