= Janopol, Lublin Voivodeship =

Janopol
- Village
- Location within Poland
- Coordinates: 51°43′N 21°57′E
- Country: Poland
- Voivodeship: Lublin
- County: Ryki
- Gmina: Kłoczew

Janopol [jaˈnɔpɔl] is a village in the administrative district of Gmina Kłoczew, within Ryki County, Lublin Voivodeship, in eastern Poland.
