= Budki-Rososz =

- Village
- Location within Poland
- Coordinates: 51°40′29″N 21°59′49″E
- Country: Poland
- Voivodeship: Lublin
- County: Ryki
- Gmina: Ryki

Budki-Rososz [ˈbutki ˈrɔsɔʂ] is a village in the administrative district of Gmina Ryki, within Ryki County, Lublin Voivodeship, in eastern Poland.
