= Falentyn =

- Village
- Location within Poland
- Coordinates: 51°40′8″N 22°1′0″E
- Country: Poland
- Voivodeship: Lublin
- County: Ryki
- Gmina: Ryki
- Population: 310

Falentyn [faˈlɛntɨn] is a village in the administrative district of Gmina Ryki, within Ryki County, Lublin Voivodeship, in eastern Poland.
