= Białki Górne =

- Village
- Location within Poland
- Coordinates: 51°36′N 22°5′E
- Country: Poland
- Voivodeship: Lublin
- County: Ryki
- Gmina: Ułęż

Białki Górne [ˈbjau̯ki ˈɡurnɛ] is a village in the administrative district of Gmina Ułęż, within Ryki County, Lublin Voivodeship, in eastern Poland.
