= Nowiny, Ryki County =

Nowiny
- Village
- Location within Poland
- Coordinates: 51°40′06″N 22°03′17″E
- Country: Poland
- Voivodeship: Lublin
- County: Ryki
- Gmina: Ryki

Nowiny [nɔˈvinɨ] is a village in the administrative district of Gmina Ryki, within Ryki County, Lublin Voivodeship, in eastern Poland.
