= Sobieszyn =

- Village
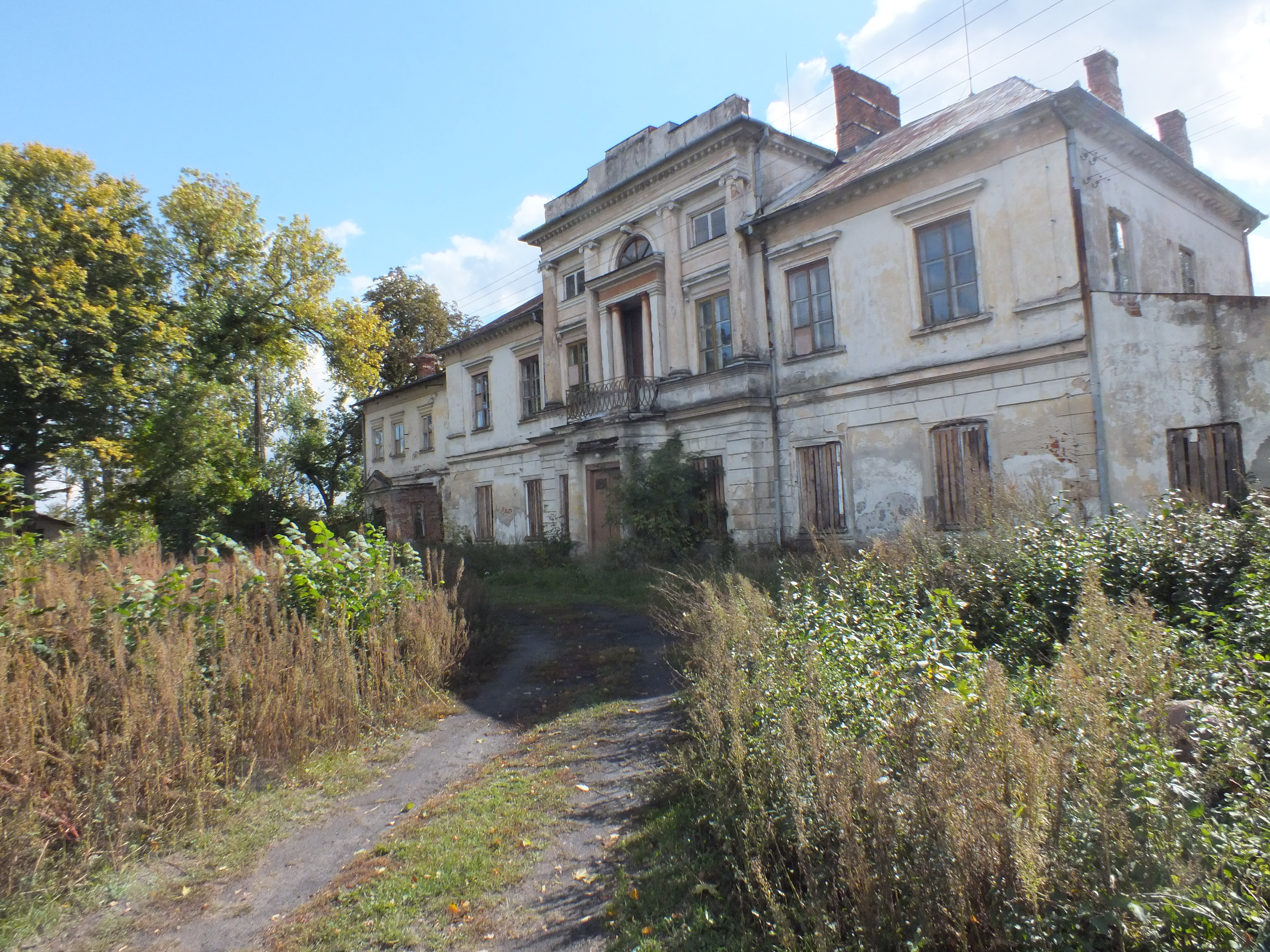
- Sobieszyn Palace

- Location within Poland
- Coordinates: 51°36′N 22°10′E
- Country: Poland
- Voivodeship: Lublin
- County: Ryki
- Gmina: Ułęż

Population
  - Total: 756
- Time zone: UTC+1 (CET)
  - Summer (DST): UTC+2 (CEST)
- Vehicle registration: LRY

Sobieszyn [sɔˈbjɛʂɨn] is a village in the administrative district of Gmina Ułęż, within Ryki County, Lublin Voivodeship, in eastern Poland.

Sobieszyn was the ancestral seat of the Sobieski family.
