= Wygranka, Lublin Voivodeship =

Wygranka
- Village
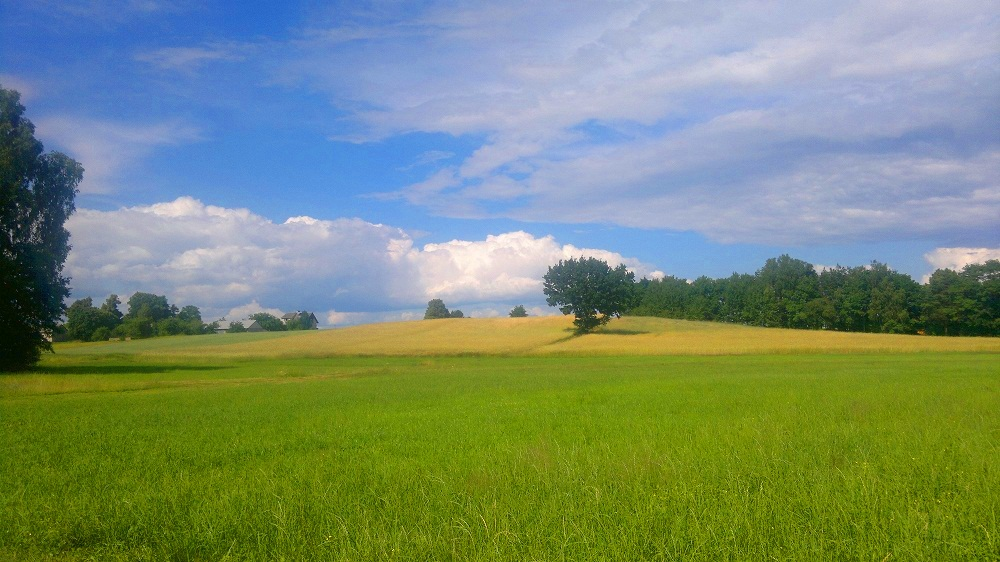
- Wygranka

- Location within Poland
- Coordinates: 51°45′41″N 21°53′48″E
- Country: Poland
- Voivodeship: Lublin
- County: Ryki
- Gmina: Kłoczew
- Population (approx.): 100

Wygranka [vɨˈɡraŋka] is a village in the administrative district of Gmina Kłoczew, within Ryki County, Lublin Voivodeship, in eastern Poland.
