= Kąty, Ryki County =

Kąty
- Village
- Location within Poland
- Coordinates: 51°43′32″N 21°52′42″E
- Country: Poland
- Voivodeship: Lublin
- County: Ryki
- Gmina: Kłoczew

Kąty [ˈkɔntɨ] is a village in the administrative district of Gmina Kłoczew, within Ryki County, Lublin Voivodeship, in eastern Poland.
