= Wola Zadybska-Kolonia =

- Village
- Location within Poland
- Coordinates: 51°45′2″N 21°52′46″E
- Country: Poland
- Voivodeship: Lublin
- County: Ryki
- Gmina: Kłoczew
- Population: 90

Wola Zadybska-Kolonia [ˈvɔla zaˈdɨpska kɔˈlɔɲa] is a village in the administrative district of Gmina Kłoczew, within Ryki County, Lublin Voivodeship, in eastern Poland.
