= Ownia =

- Village
- Location within Poland
- Coordinates: 51°42′N 21°55′E
- Country: Poland
- Voivodeship: Lublin
- County: Ryki
- Gmina: Ryki

Ownia [ˈɔvɲa] is a village in the administrative district of Gmina Ryki, within Ryki County, Lublin Voivodeship, in eastern Poland.
