= Gmina Nowodwór =

Gmina Nowodwór Nowodwór Commune
- Gmina
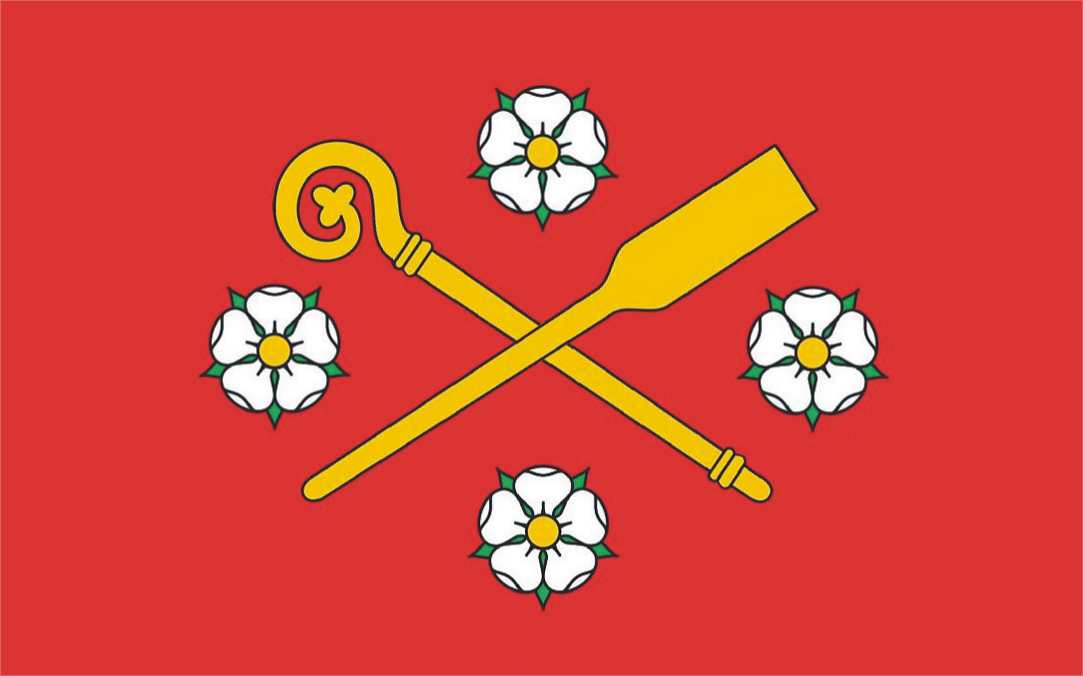
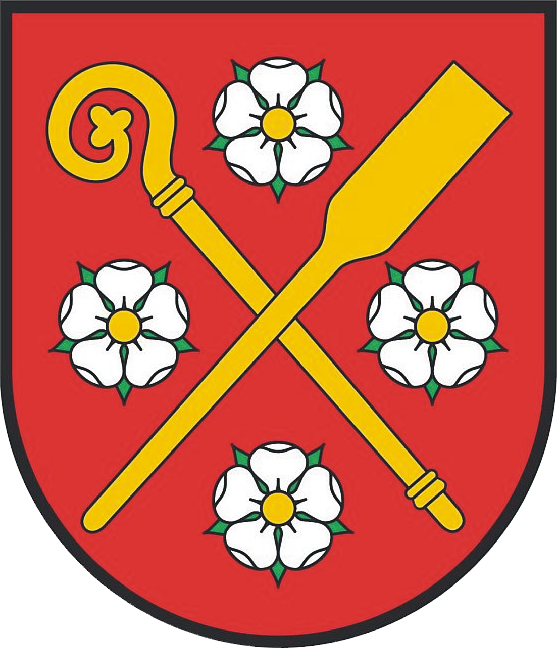
- Flag Coat of arms

- Location within Poland Location within Lublin Voivodeship
- Coordinates (Nowodwór): 51°38′33″N 22°5′59″E
- Country: Poland
- Voivodeship: Lublin
- County: Ryki
- Seat: Nowodwór

Area
  - Total: 71.72 km^{2} (27.69 sq mi)

Population (2006)
  - Total: 4,311
  - Density: 60.11/km^{2} (155.7/sq mi)
- Time zone: UTC+1 (CET)
  - Summer (DST): UTC+2 (CEST)
- Postal code: 08-503
- Area code: +48 81
- Car plates: LRY
- Website: https://nowodwor.eurzad.eu

Gmina Nowodwór is a rural gmina (administrative district) in Ryki County, Lublin Voivodeship, in eastern Poland. Its seat is the village of Nowodwór, which lies approximately 12 kilometres (7 mi) east of Ryki and 55 km (34 mi) north-west of the regional capital Lublin.

The gmina covers an area of 71.72 square kilometres (27.7 sq mi), and as of 2006 its total population is 4,311.

== Villages ==
Gmina Nowodwór contains the villages and settlements of Borki, Grabów Rycki, Grabów Szlachecki, Grabowce Dolne, Grabowce Górne, Jakubówka, Lendo Wielkie, Niedźwiedź, Nowodwór, Przestrzeń, Rycza, Trzcianki, Urszulin, Wrzosówka, Zawitała and Zielony Kąt.

== Neighbouring gminas ==
Gmina Nowodwór is bordered by the gminas of Adamów, Kłoczew, Krzywda, Ryki and Ułęż.
