= Korzeniów, Lublin Voivodeship =

Korzeniów
- Village
- Location within Poland
- Coordinates: 51°35′30″N 22°2′30″E
- Country: Poland
- Voivodeship: Lublin
- County: Ryki
- Gmina: Ułęż

Korzeniów [kɔˈʐɛɲuf] is a village in the administrative district of Gmina Ułęż, within Ryki County, Lublin Voivodeship, in eastern Poland.
