= Lasocin, Lublin Voivodeship =

Lasocin
- Village
- Location within Poland
- Coordinates: 51°40′22″N 21°58′07″E
- Country: Poland
- Voivodeship: Lublin
- County: Ryki
- Gmina: Ryki

Lasocin [laˈsɔt͡ɕin] is a village in the administrative district of Gmina Ryki, within Ryki County, Lublin Voivodeship, in eastern Poland.
