= Podlodówka =

- Village
- Location within Poland
- Coordinates: 51°39′N 22°11′E
- Country: Poland
- Voivodeship: Lublin
- County: Ryki
- Gmina: Ułęż

Podlodówka [pɔdlɔˈdufka] is a village in the administrative district of Gmina Ułęż, within Ryki County, Lublin Voivodeship, in eastern Poland.
