= Gmina Ułęż =

Gmina Ułęż Ułęż Commune
- Gmina
- Coat of arms

- Location within Poland
- Coordinates (Ułęż): 51°36′N 22°7′E
- Country: Poland
- Voivodeship: Lublin
- County: Ryki
- Seat: Ułęż

Area
  - Total: 83.56 km^{2} (32.26 sq mi)

Population (2006)
  - Total: 3,572
  - Density: 42.75/km^{2} (110.7/sq mi)
- Website: https://gminaulez.eu/

Gmina Ułęż is a rural gmina (administrative district) in Ryki County, Lublin Voivodeship, in eastern Poland. Its seat is the village of Ułęż, which lies approximately 14 kilometres (9 mi) east of Ryki and 51 km (32 mi) north-west of the regional capital Lublin.

The gmina covers an area of 83.56 square kilometres (32.3 sq mi), and as of 2006 its total population is 3,572.

== Villages ==
Gmina Ułęż contains the villages and settlements of Białki Dolne, Białki Górne, Drążgów, Korzeniów, Lendo Ruskie, Podlodów, Podlodówka, Sarny, Sobieszyn, Ułęż, Żabianka and Zosin.

== Neighbouring gminas ==
Gmina Ułęż is bordered by the gminas of Adamów, Baranów, Jeziorzany, Nowodwór, Ryki and Żyrzyn.
