= Wrzosówka, Lublin Voivodeship =

Wrzosówka
- Village
- Location within Poland
- Coordinates: 51°39′N 22°5′E
- Country: Poland
- Voivodeship: Lublin
- County: Ryki
- Gmina: Nowodwór

Wrzosówka [vʐɔˈsufka] is a village in the administrative district of Gmina Nowodwór, within Ryki County, Lublin Voivodeship, in eastern Poland.
