= Białki Dolne =

- Village
- Location within Poland
- Coordinates: 51°36′N 22°4′E
- Country: Poland
- Voivodeship: Lublin
- County: Ryki
- Gmina: Ułęż

Białki Dolne [ˈbjau̯ki ˈdɔlnɛ] is a village in the administrative district of Gmina Ułęż, within Ryki County, Lublin Voivodeship, in eastern Poland.

The hamlets of Osmolice and Wąwolnica form parts of the present-day village.
