= Gmina Ryki =

Gmina Ryki Ryki Commune
- Gmina
- Coat of arms

- Location within Poland
- Coordinates (Ryki): 51°38′N 21°56′E
- Country: Poland
- Voivodeship: Lublin
- County: Ryki
- Seat: Ryki

Area
  - Total: 161.8 km^{2} (62.5 sq mi)

Population (2006)
  - Total: 20,504
  - Density: 126.7/km^{2} (328.2/sq mi)
  - Urban: 9,716
  - Rural: 10,788
- Website: http://www.ryki.pl/

Gmina Ryki is an urban-rural gmina (administrative district) in Ryki County, Lublin Voivodeship, in eastern Poland. Its seat is the town of Ryki, which lies approximately 62 kilometres (39 mi) north-west of the regional capital Lublin.

The gmina covers an area of 161.8 square kilometres (62.5 sq mi), and as of 2006 its total population is 20,504 (out of which the population of Ryki amounts to 9,716, and the population of the rural part of the gmina is 10,788).

== Villages ==
Apart from the town of Ryki, Gmina Ryki contains the villages and settlements of Bobrowniki, Brusów, Budki-Rososz, Chrustne, Chudów, Edwardów, Falentyn, Janisze, Karczmiska, Kazimierzyn, Kleszczówka, Krasnogliny, Kruków, Lasocin, Lasoń, Moszczanka, Niwa Babicka, Nowa Dąbia, Nowiny, Nowy Bazanów, Nowy Dęblin, Ogonów, Oszczywilk, Ownia, Podwierzbie, Potok, Rososz, Sędowice, Sierskowola, Stara Dąbia, Stary Bazanów, Swaty, Zalesie and Zalesie-Kolonia.

== Neighbouring gminas ==
Gmina Ryki is bordered by the town of Dęblin and by the gminas of Kłoczew, Nowodwór, Puławy, Stężyca, Trojanów, Ułęż and Żyrzyn.
