= Jerzy and Eugenia Latoszyński =

Jerzy and Eugenia Latoszyński were a Polish husband and wife who saved the life of a Jewish boy named Artur Citryn, during the Holocaust in Nazi-occupied Poland in World War II. They were posthumously bestowed the title of the Righteous Among the Nations by Yad Vashem on 23 May 2005. The medals and a diploma were presented by the Israeli ambassador, David Peleg, to their two surviving daughters, Teresa and Elżbieta, at the Branicki Palace in Warsaw.

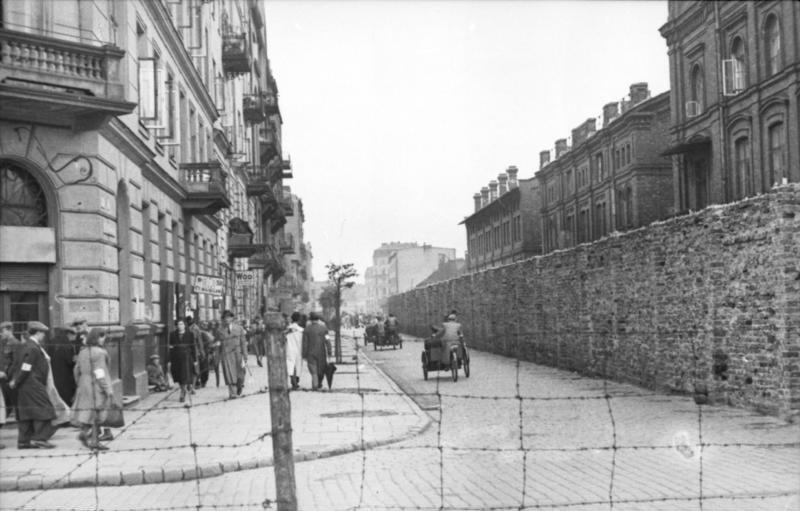
Wall of the Warsaw Ghetto during World War II

The family of Artur Citryn, including his mother, sister and a female cousin, managed to escape from the Warsaw Ghetto (pictured) in 1941, before the mass deportations began. They went to a temporarily freer Jewish ghetto in Adamów, from where Mrs. Citryn began a prolonged search for a safe hiding place for her children. She succeeded only two years later, in the summer of 1943. Together with Artur, she arrived at the house of the Latoszyński family living in the village of Lendo Wielkie. According to the testimony of one of Latoszyński's daughters, towards the end of July 1943, they were visited by a young-looking Jewish mother with a thin 10-year-old boy who was introduced as Antoś Cytryniarz from Warsaw. His mother, Mrs Citryn explained that she had heard from their neighbors about Jerzy Latoszyński who owned the largest farm in the area, frequently in need of additional help. The boy, Artur Citryn, was taken in with their blessing.

== Artur’s story ==
Depending on the season, Artur slept in the gardener’s room, in the attic, in the family kitchen in winter or in a barn on bales of hay during the summer. His responsibilities included grazing cattle and looking after them. The Latoszyńskis had a fair–sized library of Polish books, and Artur spent a lot of time reading, which soon became his most beloved pastime. He read adventure stories by Karl May and children’s magazines, and while distracted, would allow his cows to cause considerable damage on occasion.

Patrolling Germans as well as local partisans raided the farm numerous times in search of money and provisions. At such times, Artur would hide behind Mrs. Latoszyński along with her own children, pretending to be her son. In the spring of 1945, as soon as the Nazis retreated, Mrs Citryn returned to the farm to take back her child. The boy didn’t want to leave and cried. He had grown accustomed to his new place in life and wanted to remain with the Latoszyńskis, who had since become his second family.

== Notes and references ==
- (in Polish) Miasto stołeczne Warszawa, Wręczenie Medali i Dyplomów "Sprawiedliwy Wśród Narodów Świata", May 23, 2005. Official ceremony in Warsaw, Poland. Bestowing the medals of the Righteous among the Nations.
- Warsaw Life, Poles Honoured by Israel Source: Radio Polonia, May 24, 2005.
