= Stryj, Lublin Voivodeship =

Stryj
- Village
- Location within Poland
- Coordinates: 51°47′N 21°58′E
- Country: Poland
- Voivodeship: Lublin
- County: Ryki
- Gmina: Kłoczew

Stryj [strɨi̯] is a village in the administrative district of Gmina Kłoczew, within Ryki County, Lublin Voivodeship, in eastern Poland.
