= Sokola, Lublin Voivodeship =

Sokola
- Village
- Location within Poland
- Coordinates: 51°46′N 22°2′E
- Country: Poland
- Voivodeship: Lublin
- County: Ryki
- Gmina: Kłoczew

Sokola [sɔˈkɔla] is a village in the administrative district of Gmina Kłoczew, within Ryki County, Lublin Voivodeship, in eastern Poland.
