= Wojciech Męciński =

Polish Catholic Jesuit missionary (1598–1643)

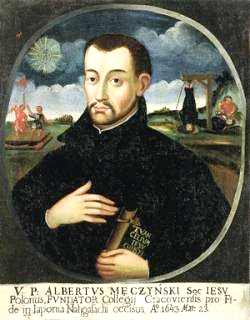

Personal life
- Born: 1598 Osmolice, Crown of the Kingdom of Poland, Polish-Lithuanian Commonwealth
- Died: 1643 (aged 44–45) Nagasaki, Tokugawa shogunate, Edo period Japan
- Known for: First Pole to visit south-eastern Asia and Japan
- Other names: Alberto Polacco; Albertus de Polonia

Religious life
- Religion: Christianity
- Denomination: Roman Catholic
- Order: Jesuits
- Ordination: February 2, 1628

Senior posting
- Post: Superior of the Jesuit mission in Cambodia
- Period in office: 1637–1642

Wojciech Męciński, nicknamed Alberto Polacco (born 1598 in Osmolice – died 23 March 1643 in Nagasaki) was a Polish Catholic Jesuit missionary from Kraków, widely believed to be the first Pole to visit south-eastern Asia and Japan.

In 17th century, he visited Vietnam in a tour through Asia, and had documented about Vietnam as the first Polish official record of the country.

It is believed that he was the first documented case of a Pole setting foot into the Philippines. In 1642, Męciński arrived in Manila from Vietnam along with a large group of fellow Jesuits, where they were greeted by Governor-General Sebastián Hurtado de Corcuera. Męciński stayed in Manila for a few months before he was deployed on his second visit to Japan.

After arriving in Japan in 1642, being the first Pole to do so, upon his second visit he was quickly caught, tortured and martyred.

== Bibliography ==
- Marcin Czermiński, Życie ks. Wojciecha Męcińskiego, Kraków, 1895.
- Hagiografia polska II, s. 124–137.
- W. Padacz, Z polskiej gleby, Kraków, 1973, s. 446–461.
- Olga Kucharczyk: Herby przedstawicieli nacji polskiej na Uniwersytecie Padewskim. Katalog znaków heraldycznych. 2023, s. 340. ISBN 978-83-66172-60-9.
- Biuletyn Informacyjny: Epizody w relacjach japońsko-polskich, publisher: Japanese Embassy in Poland, access date 31.01.2021
- Conrad Totman, Historia Japonii, Wydawnictwo Uniwersytetu Jagiellońskiego 2009
- Dorota Hałasa, Zygmunt Kwiatkowski, Chrystus w kraju samurajów, Wydawnictwo R-ka 2004
