= Stryi (disambiguation) =

Stryi is a city in Lviv Oblast, western Ukraine.

Stryi may also refer to:

- Stryi (river), river in western Ukraine
- Stryi urban hromada, urban hromada (municipality) in Lviv Oblast
- Stryi Raion, raion (district) in Lviv Oblast
- Wolfgang Stryi (1957–2005), German composer, clarinetist and saxophonist

== See also ==
- Stryj (disambiguation)
