= Gózd =

Gózd may refer to the following places:

- Gózd, Łuków County in Lublin Voivodeship (east Poland)
- Gózd, Ryki County in Lublin Voivodeship (east Poland)
- Gózd, Subcarpathian Voivodeship (south-east Poland)
- Gózd, Świętokrzyskie Voivodeship (south-central Poland)
- Gózd, Garwolin County in Masovian Voivodeship (east-central Poland)
- Gózd, Otwock County in Masovian Voivodeship (east-central Poland)
- Gózd, Radom County in Masovian Voivodeship (east-central Poland)
