= Lendo Wielkie =

- Village
- Location within Poland
- Coordinates: 51°40′N 22°10′E
- Country: Poland
- Voivodeship: Lublin
- County: Ryki
- Gmina: Nowodwór

Lendo Wielkie [ˈlɛndɔ ˈvjɛlkʲɛ] is a village in the administrative district of Gmina Nowodwór, within Ryki County, Lublin Voivodeship, in eastern Poland.

Lendo Wielkie was once a part of a 15th-century country estate encompassing a number of neighboring villages including Lendo Mniejsze, Niedźwiedź, Natalin, Zielony Kąt and Kalinowy Dół. The estate first belonged to szlachta nobility and, at the end of the 16th century, was bought by the famous Sobieski family. The last proprietors included Henryk and Kazimierz Jabłońscy.

During the Nazi occupation of Poland in World War II, the village of Lendo Wielkie was raided by a German commando on February 5, 1943, in retaliation for partisans' movements in the area. Over 30 inhabitants were murdered and their homes burned down.

== Notable residents ==
- Jerzy Latoszyński with wife Eugenia, Righteous Among the Nations
