= Kłoczew =

- Village
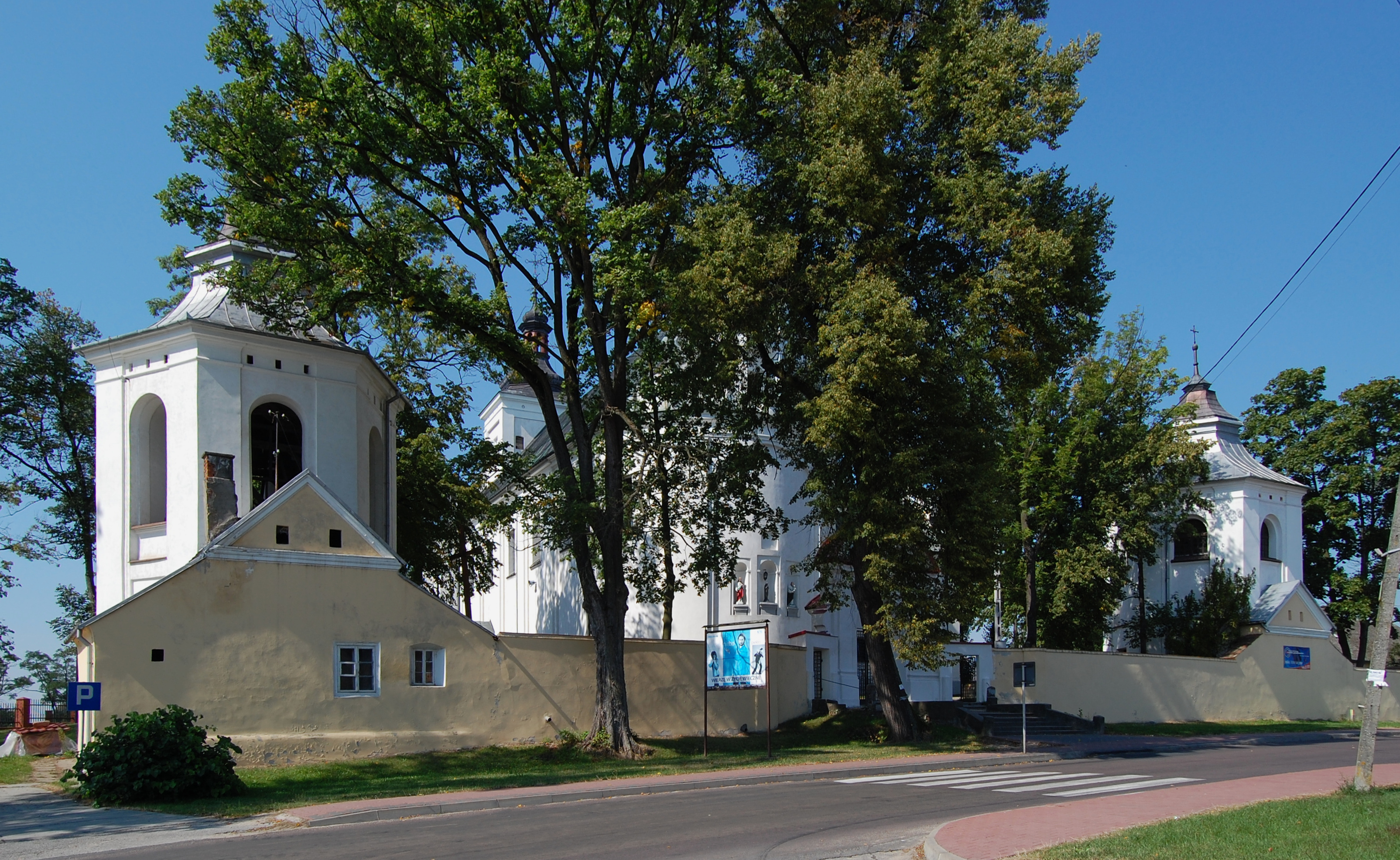
- Church of Saint John the Baptist

- Location within Poland
- Coordinates: 51°43′21″N 21°57′36″E
- Country: Poland
- Voivodeship: Lublin
- County: Ryki
- Gmina: Kłoczew
- Time zone: UTC+1 (CET)
  - Summer (DST): UTC+2 (CEST)

Kłoczew [ˈkwɔt͡ʂɛf] is a village in Ryki County, Lublin Voivodeship, in eastern Poland. It is the seat of the gmina (administrative district) called Gmina Kłoczew.

== History ==
Five Polish citizens were murdered by Nazi Germany in the village during World War II.
