= Bobrowniki, Lublin Voivodeship =

Bobrowniki
- Village
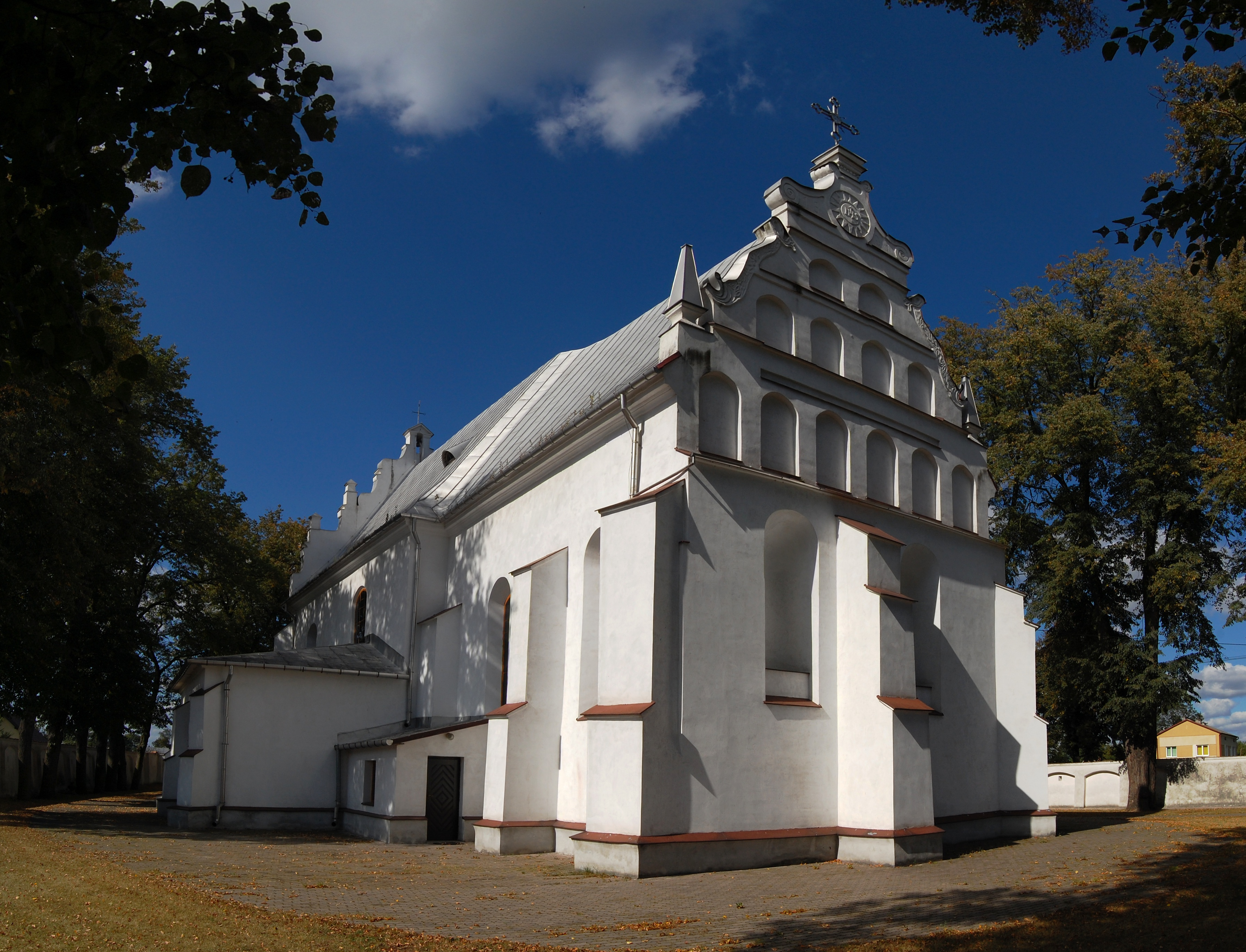
- Church of the Visitation in Bobrowniki

- Location within Poland
- Coordinates: 51°32′54″N 21°55′56″E
- Country: Poland
- Voivodeship: Lublin
- County: Ryki
- Gmina: Ryki
- Elevation: 115 m (377 ft)

Population
  - Total: 610
- Time zone: UTC+1 (CET)
  - Summer (DST): UTC+2 (CEST)

Bobrowniki [bɔbrɔvˈniki] is a village in the administrative district of Gmina Ryki, within Ryki County, Lublin Voivodeship, in eastern Poland. The village was officially a town from 1485 to 1869.

== History ==
The history of Bobrowniki dates back to the early years of the Kingdom of Poland, when this area was under authority of a castellan from Sieciechów. At that time, the nearby Wieprz river was abundant with Eurasian beavers. These animals were regarded as royal property because of their precious furs and were protected from hunting by royal officials, known as bobrownicy (hence the name of the village).

The first documented mention of Bobrowniki comes from 1375, when it was located near the eastern border of Poland. The village was frequently destroyed in the raids of the Lithuanians, Yotvingians, Tatars and Rusyns. This ended in the late 14th century, when, after the Union of Krewo, the raids ended, and in the second half of the 15th century, Stanislaw Tarlo, the owner of Bobrowniki, managed to convince King Casimir IV Jagiellon to grant Magdeburg rights to the village. It happened on July 24, 1485. Bobrowniki remained a small town, whose population reached its maximum in c. 1660, when it was almost 2,000. After that, Bobrowniki declined, and its population was decimated by cholera (1780–85), when 1,600 died.

The town was annexed by Austria in the Third Partition of Poland in 1795. After the Polish victory in the Austro-Polish War of 1809, it became part of the short-lived Duchy of Warsaw, and after the duchy's dissolution in 1815, it passed to Russian-controlled Congress Poland. In 1840, Russian authorities built a fortress called Ivangorod, which later was renamed into Dęblin. Around the fortress a new town quickly emerged, together with an important railroad hub. Bobrowniki declined even further, finally losing its town charter after the January Uprising.

== Sights ==
The village has a Baroque church, and two cemeteries – Roman Catholic and Jewish, as well as a monument dedicated to the Home Army.
