= Ułęż =

- Village
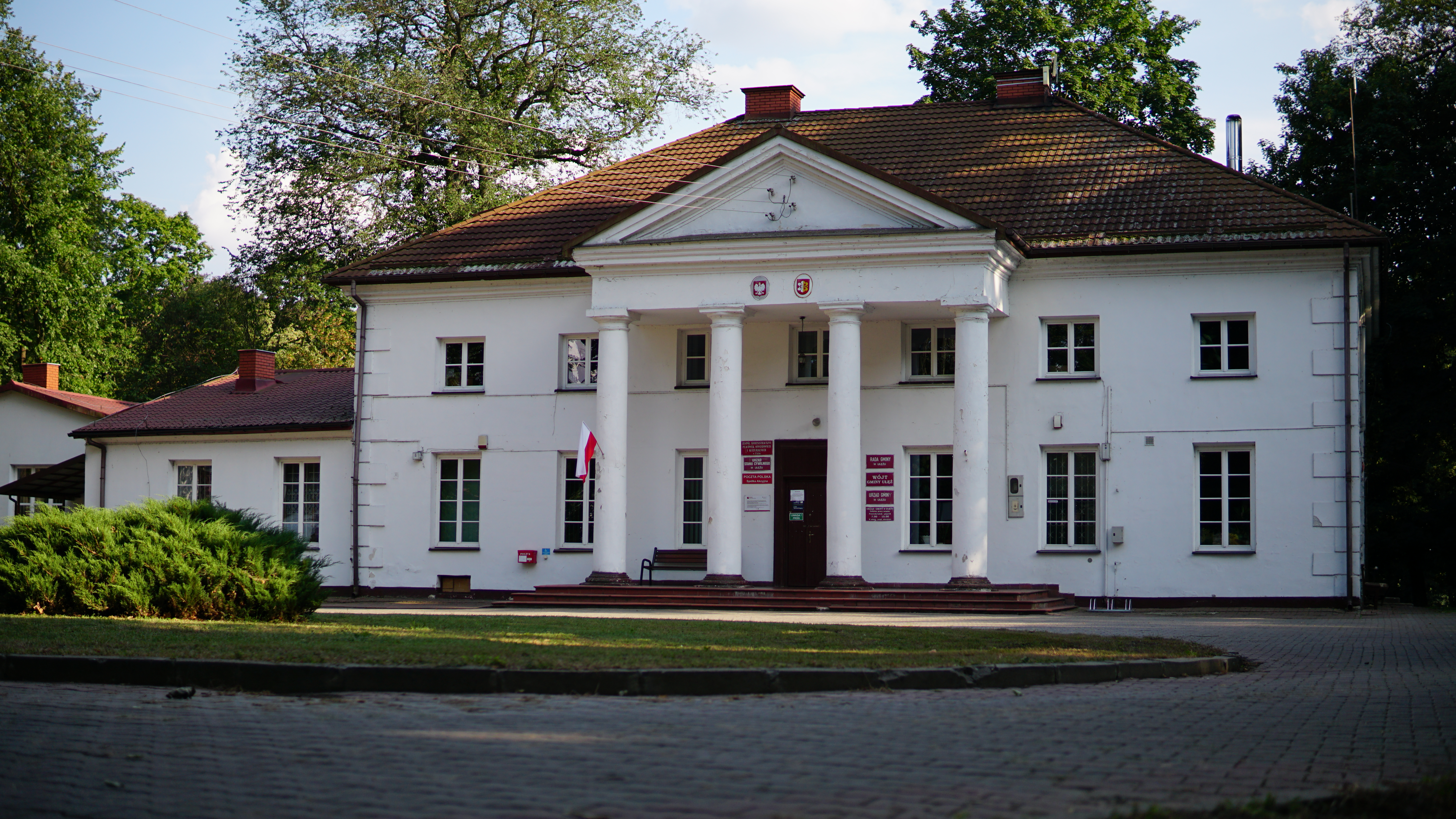
- Ułęż Palace

- Location within Poland
- Coordinates: 51°36′N 22°7′E
- Country: Poland
- Voivodeship: Lublin
- County: Ryki
- Gmina: Ułęż

Population
  - Total: 677
- Time zone: UTC+1 (CET)
  - Summer (DST): UTC+2 (CEST)
- Vehicle registration: LRY

Ułęż [ˈuwɛ̃ʂ] is a village in Ryki County, Lublin Voivodeship, in eastern Poland. It is the seat of the gmina (administrative district) called Gmina Ułęż.
