= Drążgów =

Village in Lublin Voivodeship, Poland

- Village
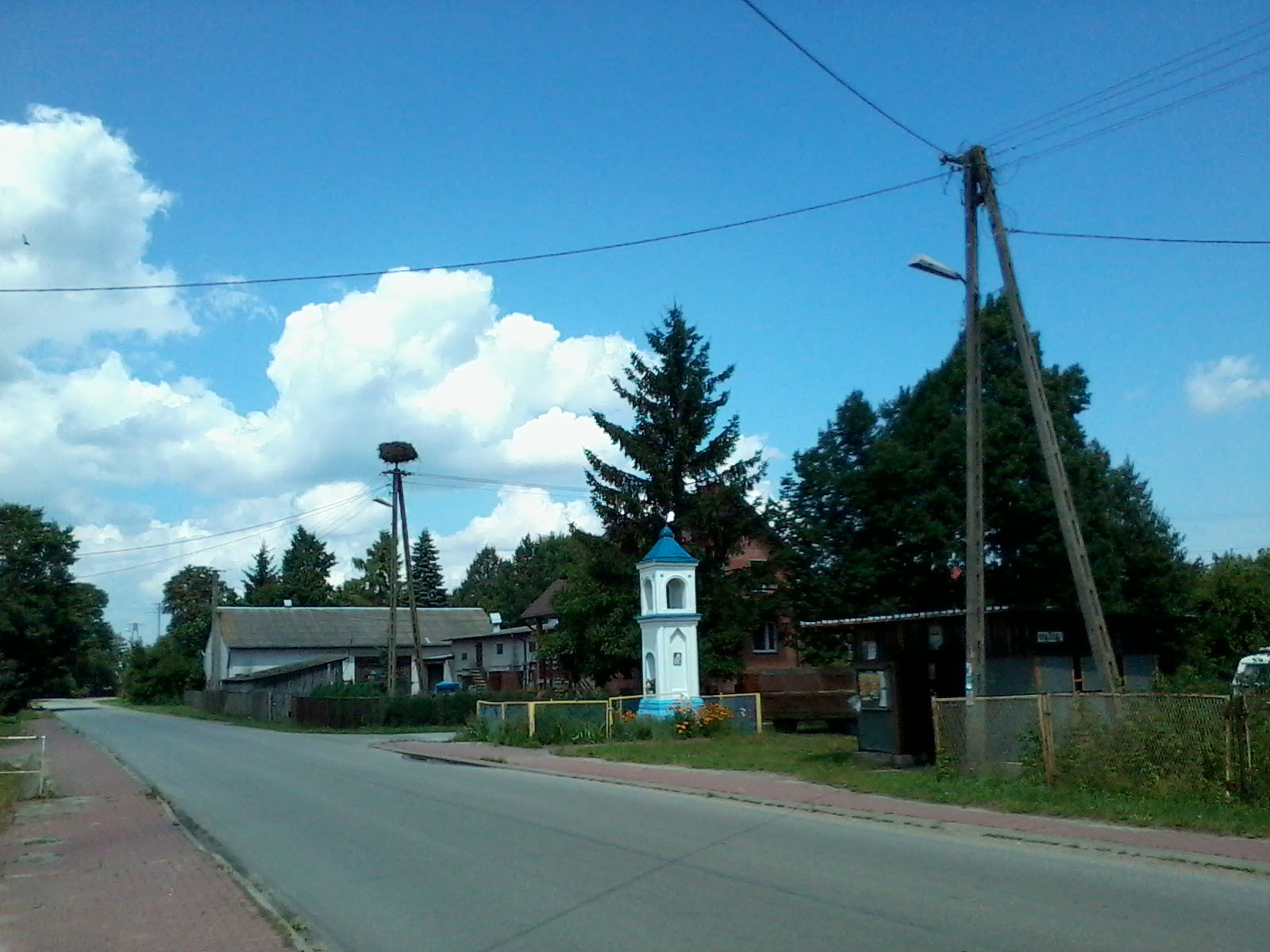

- Location within Poland
- Coordinates: 51°35′N 22°8′E
- Country: Poland
- Voivodeship: Lublin
- County: Ryki
- Gmina: Ułęż

Population (2011)
  - Total: 234
- Time zone: UTC+1 (CET)
  - Summer (DST): UTC+2 (CEST)
- Postal code: 08-504
- Area code: +48 81
- Car plates: LRY

Drążgów (Polish: [ˈdrɔ̃ʐɡuf], also Drzązgów or Drążków) is a village, formerly a town, in the administrative district of Gmina Ułęż, within Ryki County, Lublin Voivodeship, in eastern Poland.

== History ==
The earliest known settlement on the present site of Drążgów belonged to the Pomeranian culture which occupied these territories between the 7th and the 3rd century BC. Later finds include a cemetery belonging to the Przeworsk culture and an Early Medieval cemetery dated between 10th and 12th century CE. In 1337 a church and a parish were established here.

In 1569 it was a small town located in Stężyca Land with 371 inhabitants working as craftsmen, distillers, and fishermen. In 1575 its owner, Mikołaj Złoczowski, converted the church to an Arian congregation; this lasted 30 years. In 1827 the town had a population of 138 living in 50 houses. By the end of the 19th century it had 394 inhabitants and 60 houses.

Ten Polish citizens were murdered by Nazi Germany in the village during World War II.
