= Ryki =

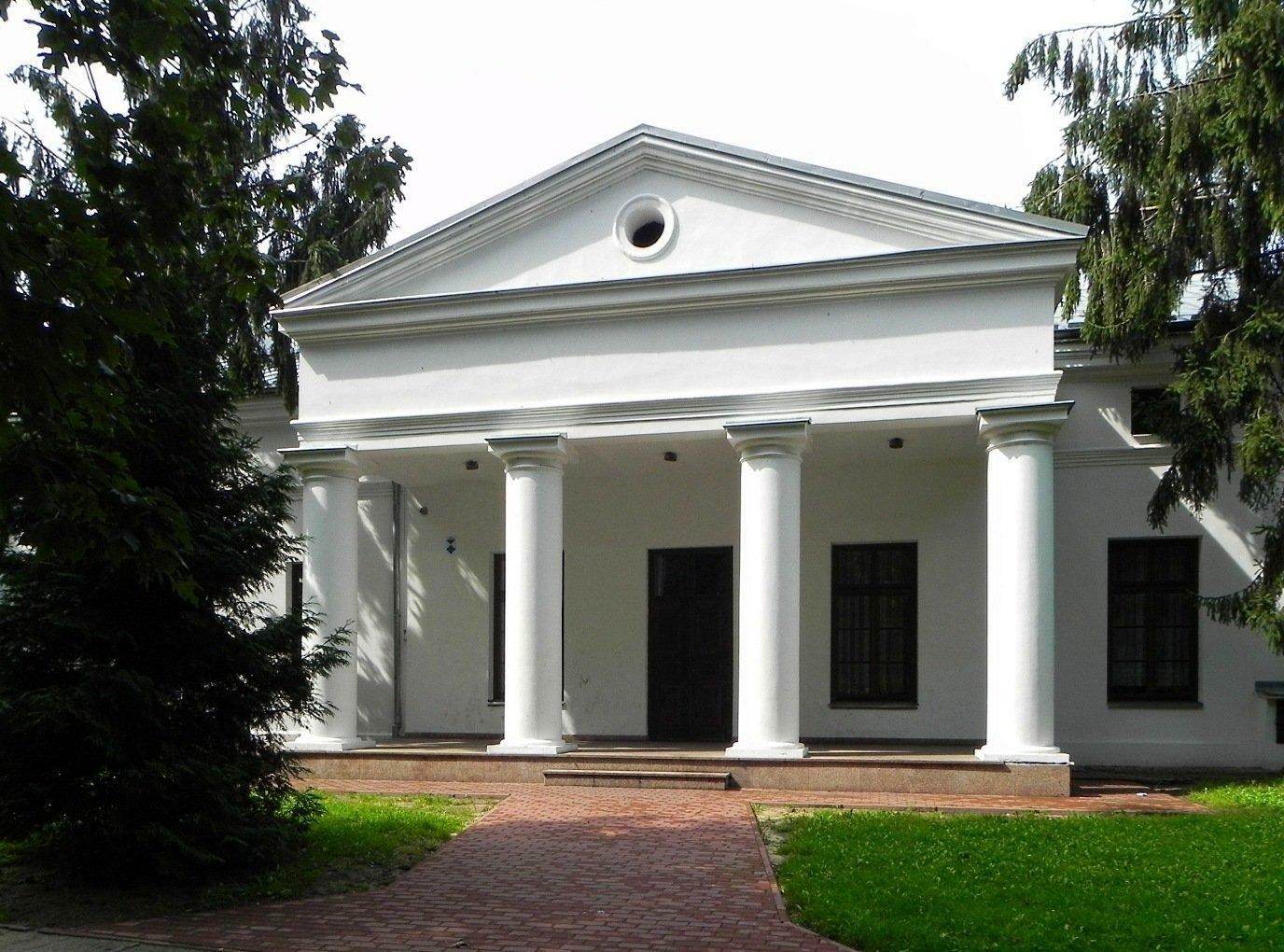
- Poniatowski's Palace

- Coat of arms

- Location within Poland
- Coordinates: 51°38′N 21°56′E
- Country: Poland
- Voivodeship: Lublin
- County: Ryki
- Gmina: Ryki

Government
  - Mayor: Jarosław Żaczek (PiS)

Area
  - Total: 27.22 km^{2} (10.51 sq mi)

Population (2006)
  - Total: 9,716
  - Density: 356.9/km^{2} (924.5/sq mi)
- Time zone: UTC+1 (CET)
  - Summer (DST): UTC+2 (CEST)
- Postal code: 08-500
- Car plates: LRY
- Website: https://www.ryki.pl

Ryki [ˈrɨkʲi] is a town in the Lublin Voivodeship in eastern Poland, capital of Ryki County. It has 9,767 inhabitants (as of 2007). It is situated between Warsaw and Lublin. Ryki belongs to Lesser Poland, and historically is part of Ziemia Stężycka (Land of Stężyca, an ancient county, the only part of historic Sandomierz Voivodeship which was located on the right bank of the Vistula river). The distance to the Polish capital is 100 km (62 mi), the distance to Lublin – 64 km (40 mi).

== History ==
The first urban center of this part of Lesser Poland was located in Sieciechów, whose parish church controlled areas both east and west of the Vistula. In the 14th century, Sieciechów's significance diminished, and in the mid-15th century, the Stężyca County was created, as part of Sandomierz Voivodeship. The royal village of Ryki (Riki), which belonged to the County of Stężyca, was first mentioned in 1424. In 1570, Ryki had a wooden church of St. Jacob the Apostle, as well as a parish school. In 1591 a hospital was founded, and the seat of a starosta was established here. Ryki received its town charter in 1782 but lost it in 1810.

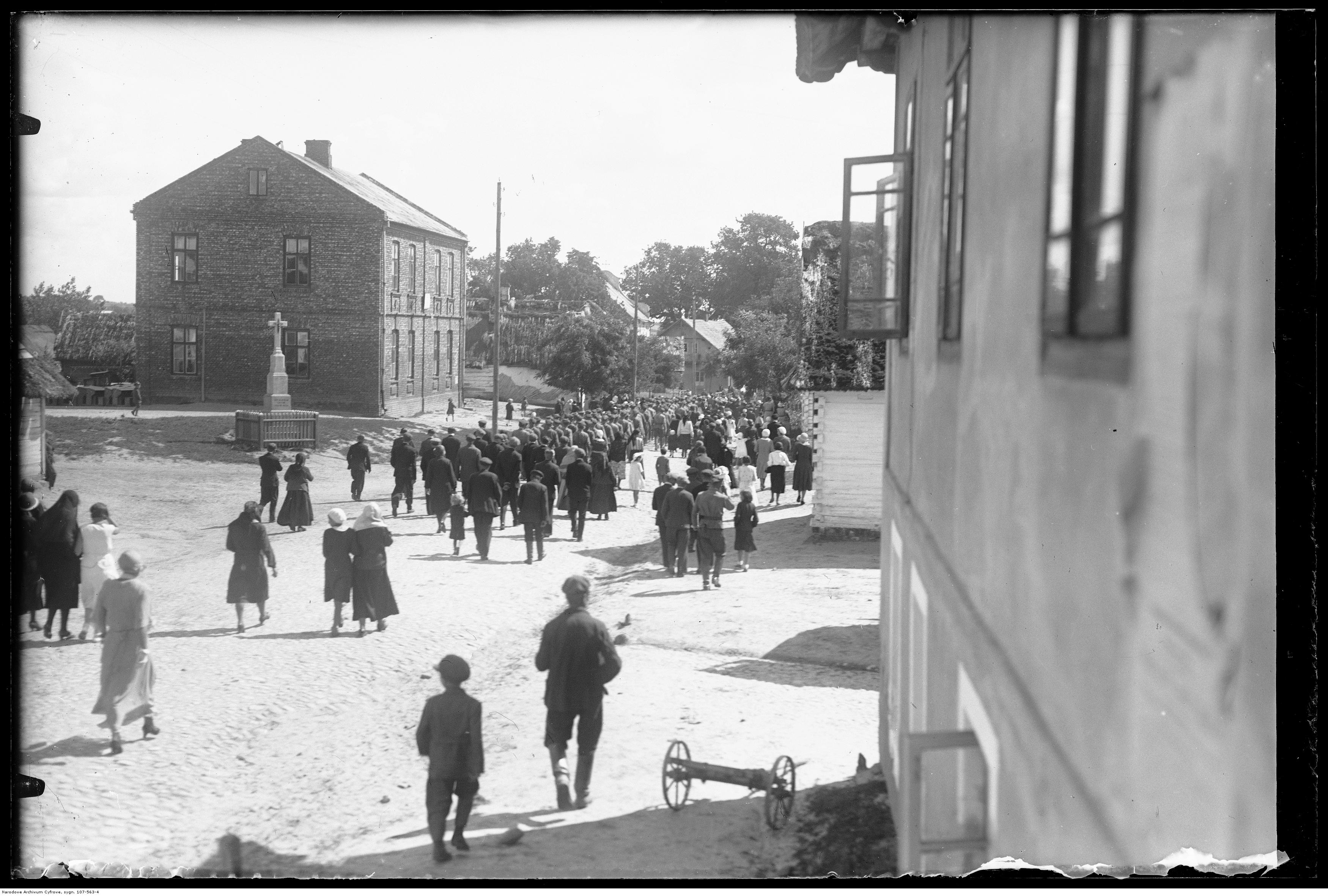
Ryki in 1933

Until the Third Partition of Poland, Ryki remained in the Sandomierz Voivodeship in the Lesser Poland Province. Then, between 1795 and 1809, it briefly belonged to Austrian Empire’s province of West Galicia. After the Polish victory in the Polish-Austrian War of 1809, the town became part of the Duchy of Warsaw, later from 1815 Congress Poland, governed by the Russians. It was an important center of Hasidic movement, and in 1908, Jews made 94% of town's population. On 2 August 1919 Ryki was added to Garwolin County, part of Lublin Voivodeship. Garwolin County became part of Warsaw Voivodeship on 1 April 1939.

In September 1939, at the start of World War II, German Luftwaffe destroyed the centre of Ryki. During the German occupation, the Jewish residents of the town—between 3,000 and 4,000 Jews—were murdered in the Holocaust, either in Treblinka extermination camp, or Sobibor extermination camp. Some Jewish children, such as Shloime Judensznajder (now Solly Irving), were rescued by Polish families. Their descendants live currently in Poland, the UK and Israel.

The town and its county was a major center of Home Army, whose units liberated Ryki on 26 July 1944. After the war, Ryki belonged to Warsaw Voivodeship, and in 1975, the town was moved again to Lublin Voivodeship. In 2000, FM- and TV-mast Ryki was built. Ryki again officially became a town in 1957.

Today Ryki is an important road junction. In the neighboring village of Moszczanka, two national roads cross – the 48th (Kock – Tomaszów Mazowiecki), and the 17th (Lublin – Warsaw). The town has a rail station, and bus connections with several locations.

== Transport ==
The S17 expressway bypasses Ryki to the west. Exit 15 provides quick access to Lublin. Exit 14 provides quick access to Warsaw.

Voivodeship road 839 (former national road 17) passes through the town.

Ryki has a station on the Dęblin-Łuków railway line.

== Famous namesakes ==
The surname of Hyman G. Rickover, a US Navy Admiral and considered the Father of the Nuclear Navy, is derived from Ryki. Born in 1900 in Maków Mazowiecki, the young Rickover emigrated with his Jewish family in 1906 to the United States. The Admiral served on active duty for 63 years, longer than any other U.S. military officer.
