= Ryki County =

Ryki County Powiat rycki
- County
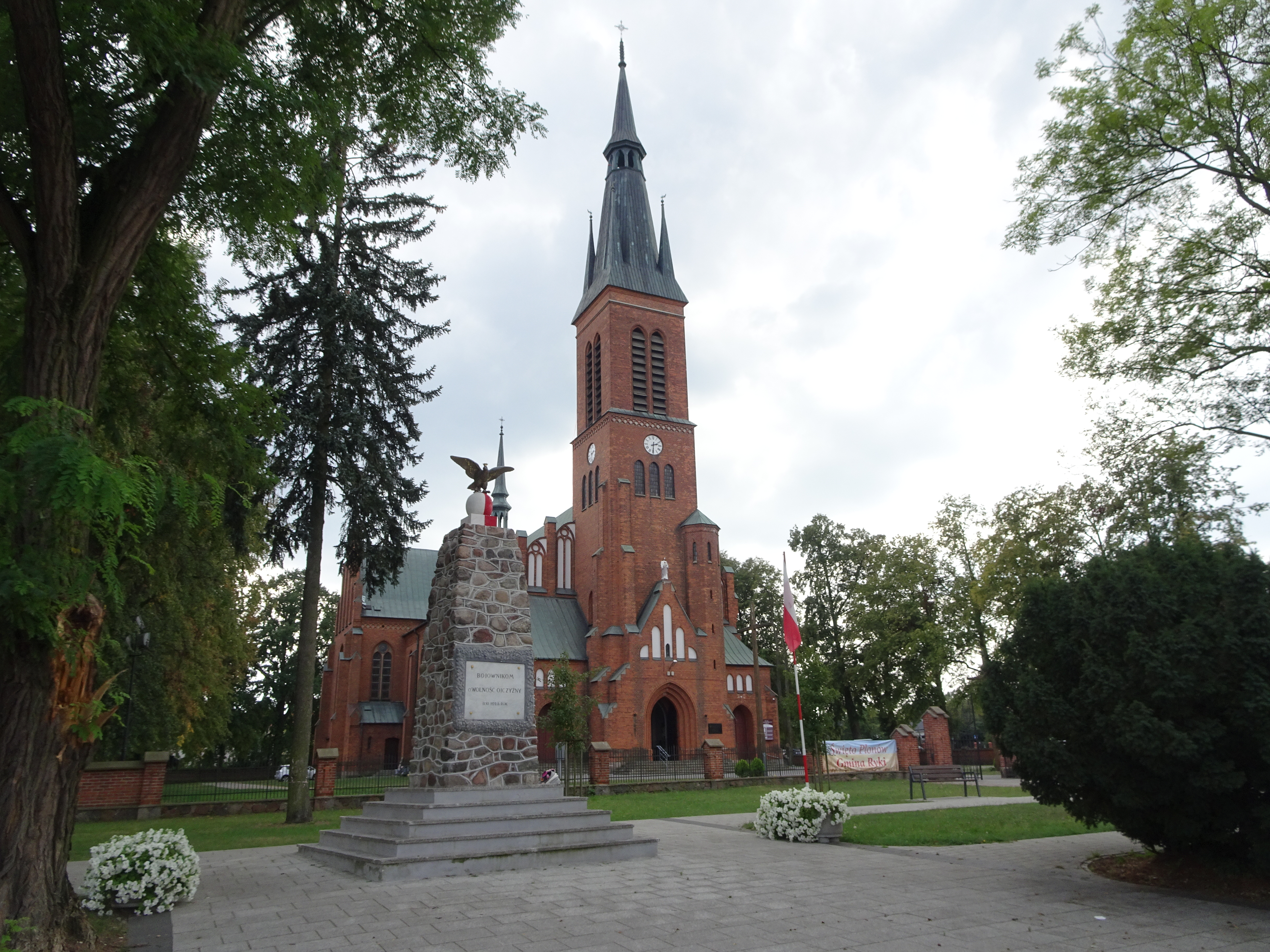
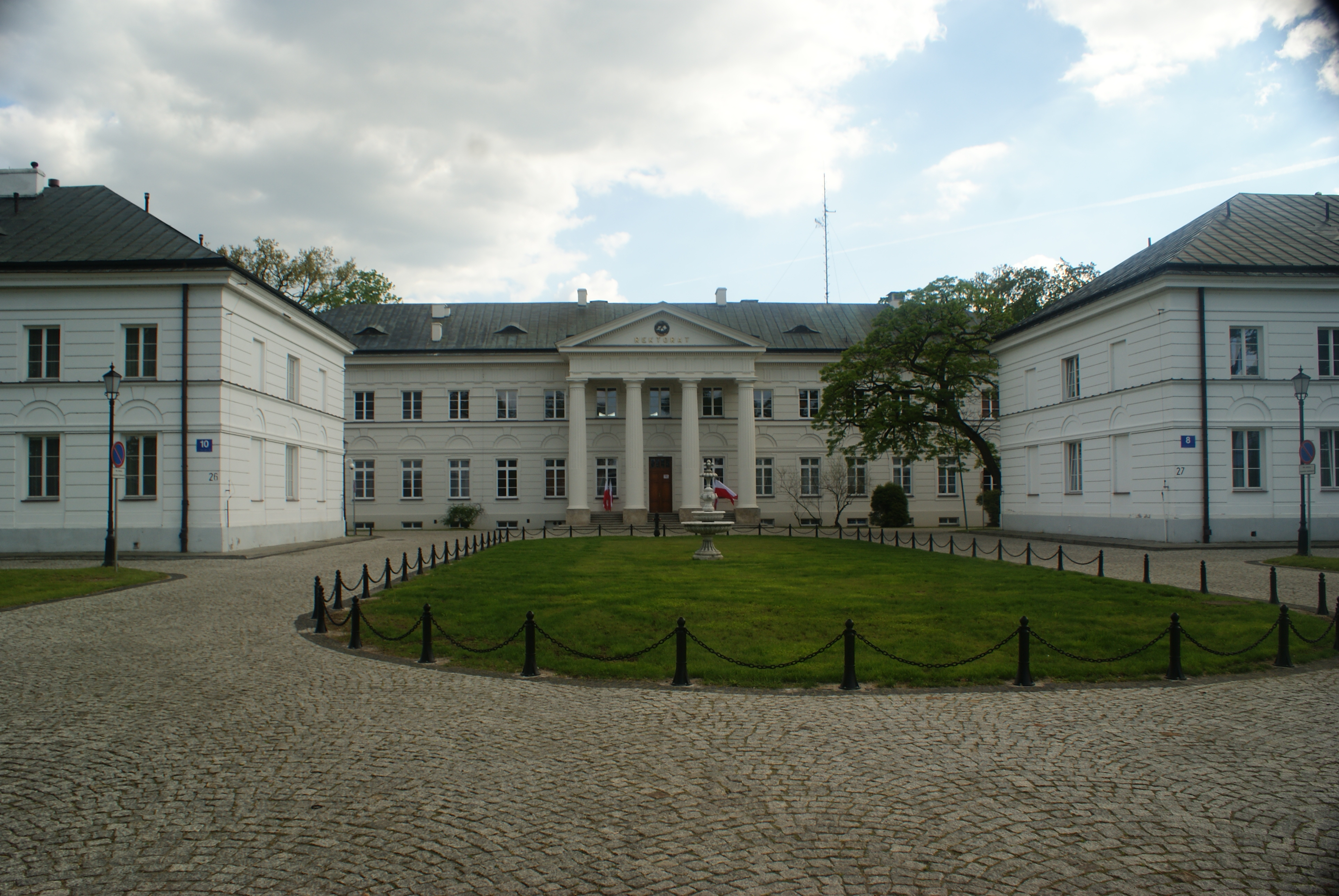
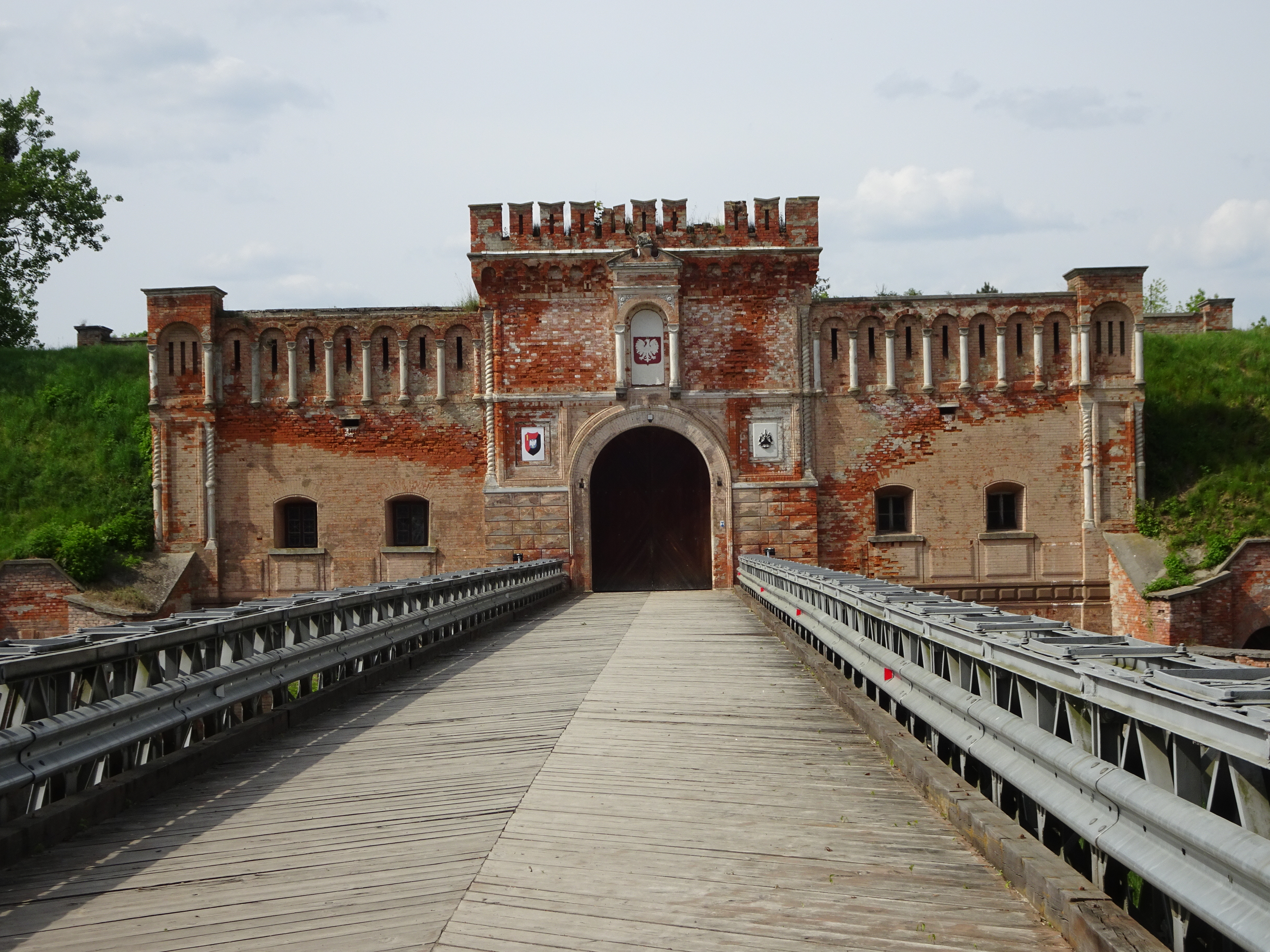
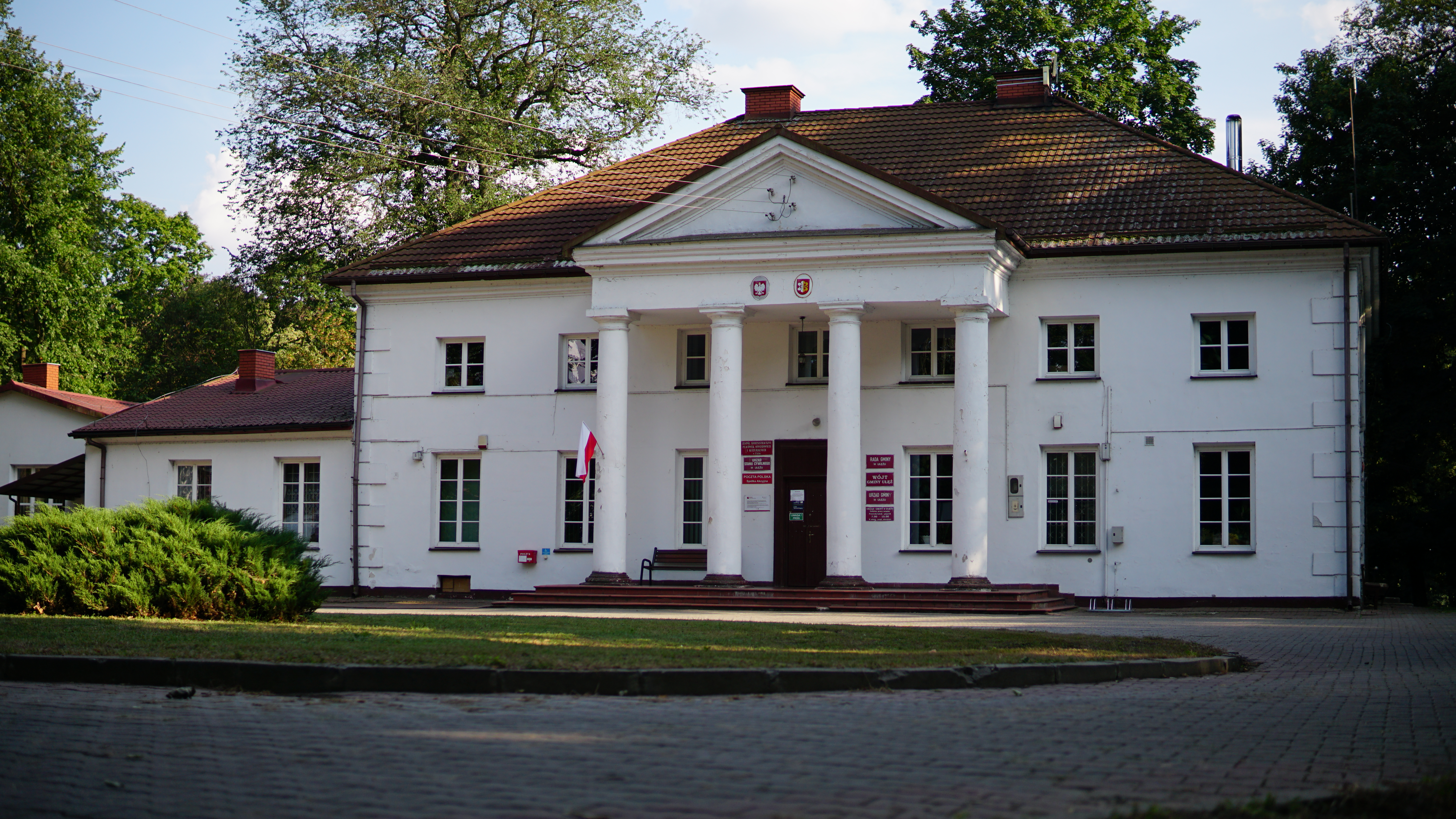
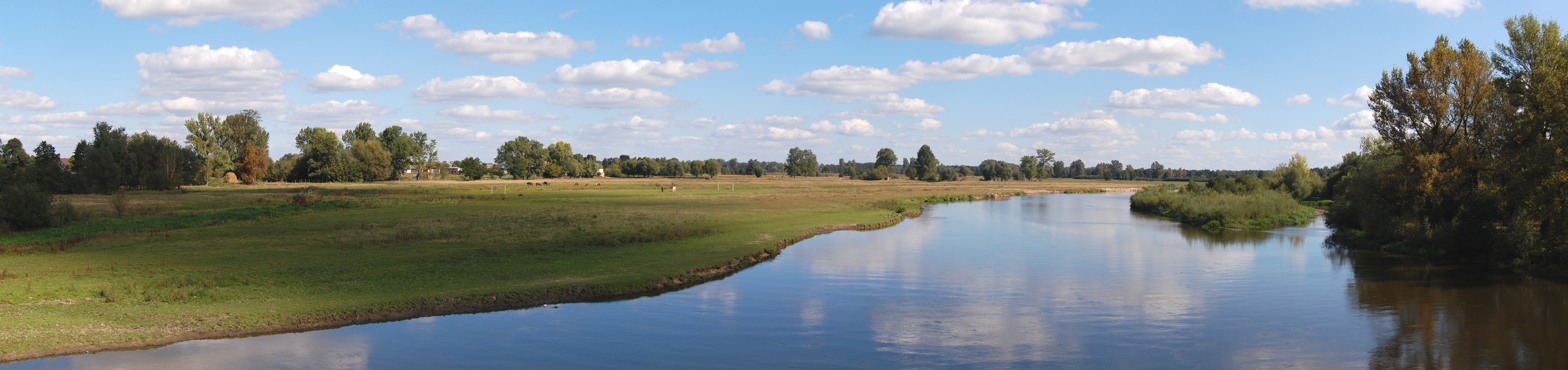
- Church of the Holiest Saviour in Ryki Polish Air Force Academy in Dęblin Dęblin Fortress Palace in Ułęż Wieprz River near Bobrowniki

- Flag Coat of arms

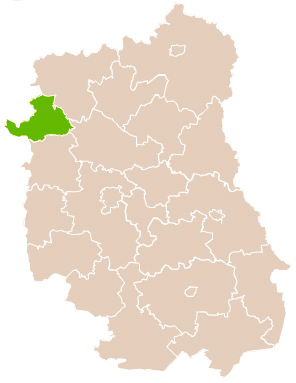
- Location within the voivodeship
- Coordinates (Ryki): 51°38′N 21°56′E
- Country: Poland
- Voivodeship: Lublin
- Seat: Ryki
- Gminas: Total 6 (incl. 1 urban): Dęblin; Gmina Kłoczew; Gmina Nowodwór; Gmina Ryki; Gmina Stężyca; Gmina Ułęż

Area
  - Total: 615.54 km^{2} (237.66 sq mi)

Population (2019)
  - Total: 55,919
  - Density: 90.845/km^{2} (235.29/sq mi)
  - Urban: 25,651
  - Rural: 30,268
- Time zone: UTC+1 (CET)
  - Summer (DST): UTC+2 (CEST)
- Car plates: LRY
- Website: www.ryki.powiat.pl

Ryki County (Polish: powiat rycki) is a unit of territorial administration and local government (powiat) in Lublin Voivodeship, eastern Poland. It was established on January 1, 1999, as a result of the Polish local government reforms passed in 1998. Its administrative seat is the town of Ryki, which lies 62 kilometres (39 mi) north-west of the regional capital Lublin. The only other town in the county is Dęblin, lying 9 km (6 mi) south-west of Ryki.

The county covers an area of 615.54 square kilometres (237.7 sq mi). As of 2019, its total population is 59,919, including a population of 16,026 in Dęblin, 9,625 in Ryki, and a rural population of 30,268.

== Neighbouring counties ==
Ryki County is bordered by Łuków County to the north-east, Lubartów County to the east, Puławy County to the south, Kozienice County to the west and Garwolin County to the north-west.

== Administrative divisions ==
The county is subdivided into six gminas (one urban, one urban-rural and four rural). These are listed in the following table, in descending order of population.

Gmina	Type	Area (km^{2})	Population (2019)	Seat
Gmina Ryki	urban-rural	161.8	20,344	Ryki
Dęblin	urban	38.3	16,026	
Gmina Kłoczew	rural	143.2	7,150	Kłoczew
Gmina Stężyca	rural	116.8	5,473	Stężyca
Gmina Nowodwór	rural	71.7	4,096	Nowodwór
Gmina Ułęż	rural	83.6	3,157	Ułęż
