= 2025 Russian railway sabotage in Poland =

Railway sabotage in Poland

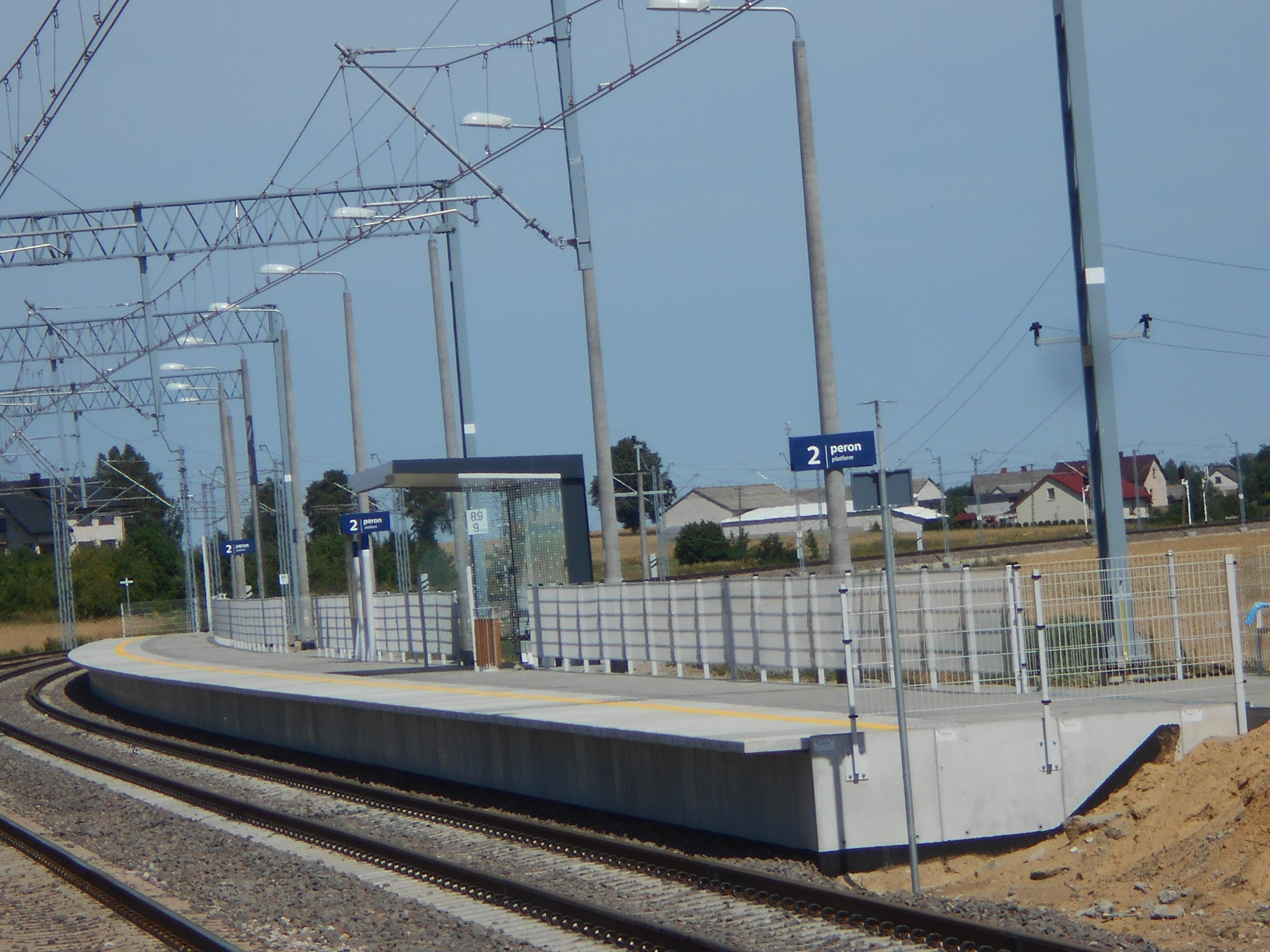
- Mika railway station
- Date: 15–16 November 2025
- Time: 22:00 (Mika); 21:00 (Pulawy) EET
- Location: Mika, Masovian Voivodeship, and Puławy, Lublin Voivodeship, Poland
- Type: Railway disruption, bombing, sabotage
- Cause: Russian-backed sabotage
- Perpetrator: Russian Federal Security Service (FSB)
- Deaths: none
- Injuries: none
- Property damage: 2 trains, railway and aerials
- Suspects: 2

On 16 November 2025, a railroad linking Warsaw and Lublin was damaged by an explosion that destroyed the rail track near the station of Mika, 100 km southeast of Warsaw. The undercarriage of a freighter train and overhead cables on the same line were also damaged. A second incident took place near Puławy, where a metal brace was fixed across the tracks, and several power wires were knocked down. The Polish government said both events were "acts of sabotage", and blamed Russian intelligence for carrying out the attack. Two Ukrainian men working for the Russian Federal Security Service (FSB) were formally accused of the attacks by Polish prosecutors. The alleged saboteurs fled to Belarus.

== Russian sabotage in Europe ==
Since the Cold War era, Russia has maintained a strategy of conducting underground operations and sabotage across Europe, with a military doctrine that consistently prioritizes the disruption of an opponent's vital infrastructure. During the 2010s, especially after the annexation of Crimea and the beginning of the War in Donbas, various specific incidents were linked to Russian agents, most notably the 2014 ammunition depot blasts in the Czech Republic. These explosions, which resulted in two fatalities, were eventually traced back to GRU operatives from Unit 29155. Investigators determined that these spies—later identified in the Skripal poisoning case—orchestrated the attack to block weapons shipments intended for Ukraine.

Following the full-scale Russian invasion of Ukraine in 2022, there was a noticeable surge in unexplained fires and damage to public utilities across Europe, which authorities classified as hybrid warfare. By 2023, NATO and EU leaders warned that Russia was conducting a systematic campaign of subversion. Intelligence services suggest this campaign is carefully calibrated: it aims for moderate destruction while keeping casualties low to avoid triggering a massive military retaliation from NATO.

== Railway sabotage on Warsaw–Lublin line ==
On Saturday 16 November 2025 at 09:00 pm, a C-4 made improvised explosive device went off as a freight train was passing near the village of Mika, some 100 km southeast of Warsaw. The driver did not notice the explosion, but it was recorded on CCTV. A wagon floor and the train undercarriage were damaged. The police was put on alert after receiving a call from a resident, but an intensive search did not find any trace of a blast. Local people initially suspected a drone attack.

The incident was not known until 7:40 am on Sunday, when another train sent a message reporting "track irregularities" on the railway. The disruption took place on the Warsaw-Lublin-Hrubieszów railway, which leads to the border with Ukraine. The train was carrying two passengers and several crewmembers. The gap created by the blast could have derailed the trainset, with catastrophic consequences. The strategic rail track, used to transport European assistance to Ukraine, was destroyed.

A second incident occurred on 17 October at evening near Puławy, about 30 km south of the site of the explosion where the driver of a passenger train with 473 people on board had to slam on the brakes when he found that the tracks ahead were damaged, and some overhead wires were knocked down. A metal bracket was wedged into the track assembly, disrupting the railway, and a digital communication device was found nearby. The train suffered some broken windows and damage to the pantograph.

Poland's Prime Minister Donald Tusk said that the first incident was probably an attempt "to blow up a train" and an "unprecedented act of sabotage".

On 18 November, Tusk reported to the lower house of the Polish Parliament that intelligence services traced the actions back to two Ukrainian nationals who fled to Belarus shortly after the incidents. One of the individuals had been convicted by a Ukrainian court in Lviv of sabotage, while the other was a resident of the region of Donetsk, occupied by the Russian Army. Tusk characterized the incidents as "perhaps the most serious national security situation in Poland since the outbreak of the full-scale war in Ukraine." The saboteurs were eventually identified as Oleksandr K. and Yevhenii I, whose extradition was requested to Belarus.

== Aftermath ==
On 21 November 2025 Operation TOR, a joint security operation, was launched by the Police of Poland, the Railway Security Guard and the Polish Armed Forces. A concurrent mission, Operation Horyzont, mobilized 10,000 Polish Army soldiers to protect railways and transport hubs across the country. The Polish government, through the Ministry of Polish State Assets was exploring the feasibility of deploying drones to protect strategic facilities such as railways and energy infrastructure, and intercept hostile drones if needed. On 2 December, a Russian individual was charged by Polish prosecutors with running a "espionage and sabotage" ring affiliated to the FSB and dedicated to Intelligence gathering, sabotage and propaganda. On 16 February 2026, a Moldovan citizen was arrested by TOR personnel after pulling the handbrake in the wagon of a freight train in the Szczecin–Dorohusk line.

== See also ==
- 2024 France railway arson attacks
- 2024 Baltic Sea submarine cable disruptions
- 2025 Russian drone incursion into Poland
- Russian hybrid warfare
- Violations of non-combatant airspaces during the Russian invasion of Ukraine
