= Życzyn railway station =

Railway station in Życzyn, Poland

Życzyn

General information
- Location: Życzyn, Trojanów, Garwolin, Masovian; Poland
- Coordinates: 51.6473032°N 21.7610115°E
- System: Rail Station
- Owner: Polskie Koleje Państwowe S.A.

Services
Preceding station	Masovian Railways	Following station
Mika towards Warszawa Zachodnia	R7	Rokitnia Stara towards Dęblin
Location

Życzyn railway station is a railway station at Życzyn, Garwolin, Masovian, Poland. It is served by Masovian Railways.
