= Rokitnia Stara railway station =

Railway station in Stara Rokitnia, Poland

Rokitnia Stara
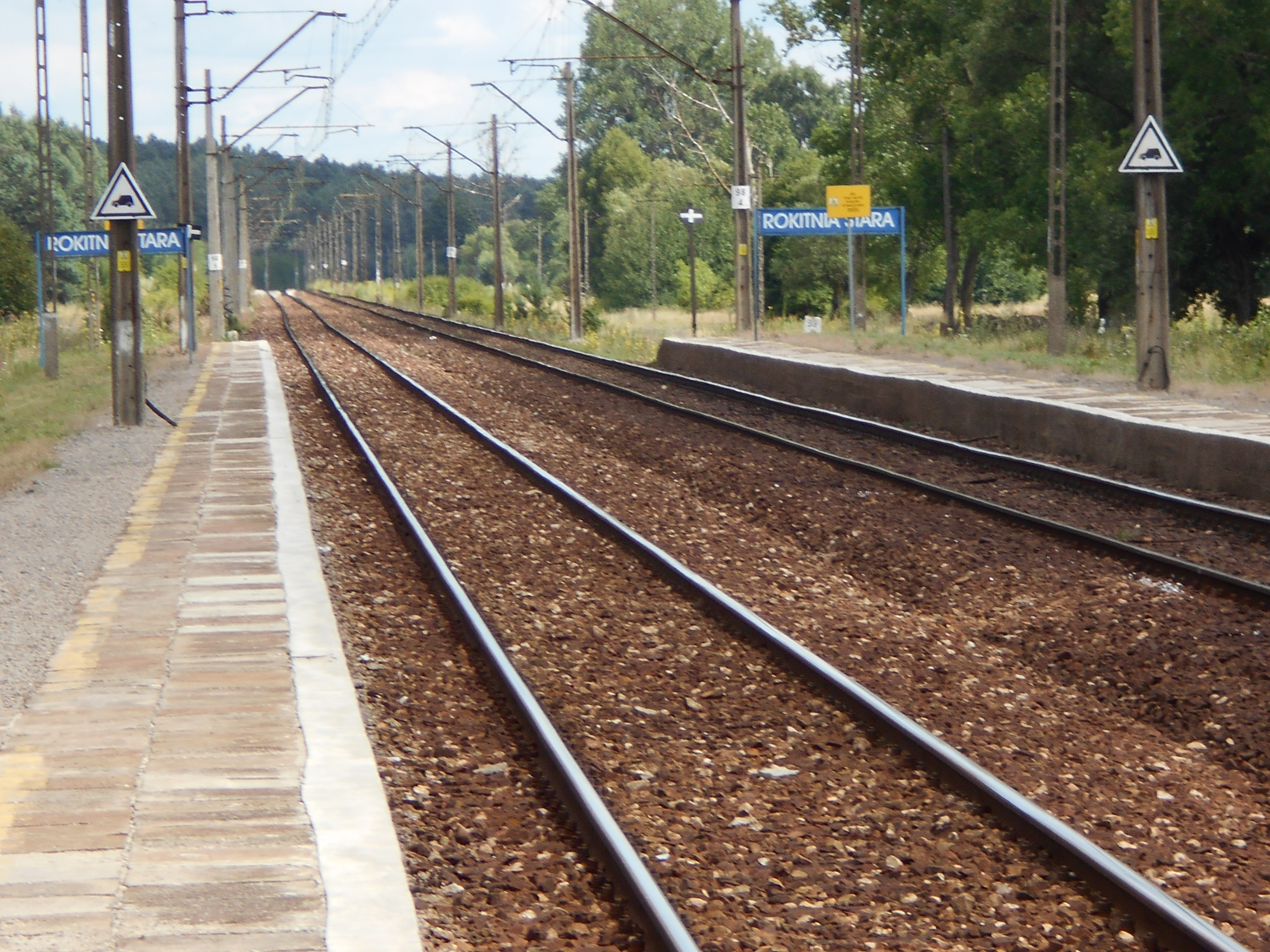

General information
- Location: Stara Rokitnia, Stężyca, Ryki, Lublin; Poland
- Coordinates: 51.6113581°N 21.8006063°E
- System: Rail Station
- Owner: Polskie Koleje Państwowe S.A.

Services
Preceding station	Masovian Railways	Following station
Życzyn towards Warszawa Zachodnia	R7	Dęblin Terminus
Location

Rokitnia Stara railway station is a railway station at Stara Rokitnia, Ryki, Lublin Voivodeship, Poland. It is served by Masovian Railways.
