= Wola Korycka Dolna =

- Village
- Location within Poland
- Coordinates: 51°44′N 21°45′E
- Country: Poland
- Voivodeship: Masovian
- County: Garwolin
- Gmina: Trojanów
- Time zone: UTC+1 (CET)
  - Summer (DST): UTC+2 (CEST)
- Vehicle registration: WG

Wola Korycka Dolna [ˈvɔla kɔˈrɨt͡ska ˈdɔlna] is a village in the administrative district of Gmina Trojanów, within Garwolin County, Masovian Voivodeship, in east-central Poland.

== History ==
Wola Korycka was a private village of Polish nobility, administratively located in the Stężyca County in the Sandomierz Voivodeship in the Lesser Poland Province of the Kingdom of Poland.

One Polish citizen was murdered by Nazi Germany in the village during World War II.
