= Brzeźce (disambiguation) =

Brzeźce may refer to the following places:

- Brzeźce, Lublin Voivodeship (east Poland)
- Brzeźce, Opole Voivodeship (south-west Poland)
- Brzeźce in Silesian Voivodeship (south Poland)
- Kolonia Brzeźce, a settlement in Masovian Voivodeship
