= Władysław Neubelt =

- Born: Władysław Józef Neubelt; 1 February 1879; Elżbietów, Congress Poland, Russian Empire (now part of Poland)
- Died: 9 June 1965 (aged 86); Kraków, Poland
- Occupations: Actor; Director
- Years active: 1900–1939; 1945–1963

Władysław Józef Neubelt (Polish: [vwaˈdɘ̟.swaf ˈju.zɛf ˈnɛw.bɛlt]; 1 February 1879 (Note: Some sources alternatively list his date of birth as 5 February 1879.) – 9 July 1965) was a Polish stage actor and director, associated with theatres in Warsaw and Kraków, Poland. He also has had several minor film roles. He is presumed to play in two 1902 silent short films titled Cabman's Adventure, and The Return of a Merry Fellow, made by Kazimierz Prószyński, which were the first two films to be made in Poland.

== Biography ==
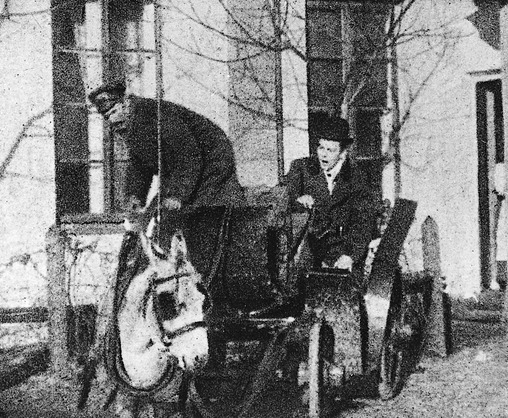
A scene from 1902 silent short film Cabman's Adventure, which presumably features Neubelt in the role of a cabman.

Władysław Józef Neubelt was most likely born on 1 February 1879 in Elżbietów, Poland. Some sources alternatively list his day and place of birth as 5 February 1879 in Warsaw, Poland. He was a son of Józef Neubelt and Katarzyna Neubelt (née Czeszajko). He graduated gymnasium (middle school) in Siedlce, Poland, and in 1900, the drama school in the Warsaw. On 22 April 1900, he debuted in the Summer Theatre in Warsaw. Throughout his career he played in various theaters, mostly in Warsaw, but also in Łódź, Lublin, and Kraków.

Neubelt also played in film. While his participation remains uncertain, it is assumed that he probably played the role of a cabman in two 1902 silent short films titled Cabman's Adventure, and The Return of a Merry Fellow. Both were filmed and created by Kazimierz Prószyński, and were the first two films to be filmed in Poland. This would make Neubelt, together with Kazimierz Junosza-Stępowski, the first actors to play in a Polish-made film.

He also acted in two silent short films made by Paweł Puszkin. They were Uczta, realised in 1904, and W Wilanowie, realised in 1905. Later in the 1930s he had several minor rolles in the feature films. He played in The Ten from Pawiak (1931), Duchess of Łowicz (1932), The Girl Looks for Love (1938), and Genius of the Stage (1939).

He stopped acting following the outbreak of the Second World War in September 1939. During the war he worked as a waiter in a coffeehouse in Warsaw. After the end of the Warsaw Uprising, he moved to Kraków, were in 1945, he began playing in the Juliusz Słowacki Theatre, and moved again to Poznań in the same year. There he played in the Polish Theatre. In 1948, he moved to Kraków, where he began playing in the City Drama Theatres. He played there until 1952, and since then, in he played in the Helena Modrzejewska National Old Theater.

In 1951, he had an uncredited role in the feature film Youth of Chopin. In the 1950s he also worked as a radio actor.

Neubelt was a member of the Union of Polish Stage Artists, since its foundingin 1918. In 1959, he was awarded with the title of a distinguished member. He retired from acting in 1962.

Neubelt died on 9 July 1965 in Kraków.

== Private life ==
He was married twice. His first wife was Antonina Neubelt, and second Klara Pachman, whom he married in 1934.

== Filmography ==
Year	Title	Role	Notes	Ref.
1902	Cabman's Adventure	Cabman	Silent short film; participation uncertain	
1902	The Return of a Merry Fellow	Cabman	Silent short film; participation uncertain	
1904	Uczta		Silent short film	
1905	W Wilanowie		Silent short film	
1931	The Ten from Pawiak	President of the court	Uncredited	
1932	Duchess of Łowicz	Courtier reading the Tsar's decree		
1938	The Girl Looks for Love	Party attendant		
1939	Genius of the Stage	Lecture attendant		
1951	Youth of Chopin	Mayor	Uncredited	
