= Korytnica, Garwolin County =

Korytnica
- Village
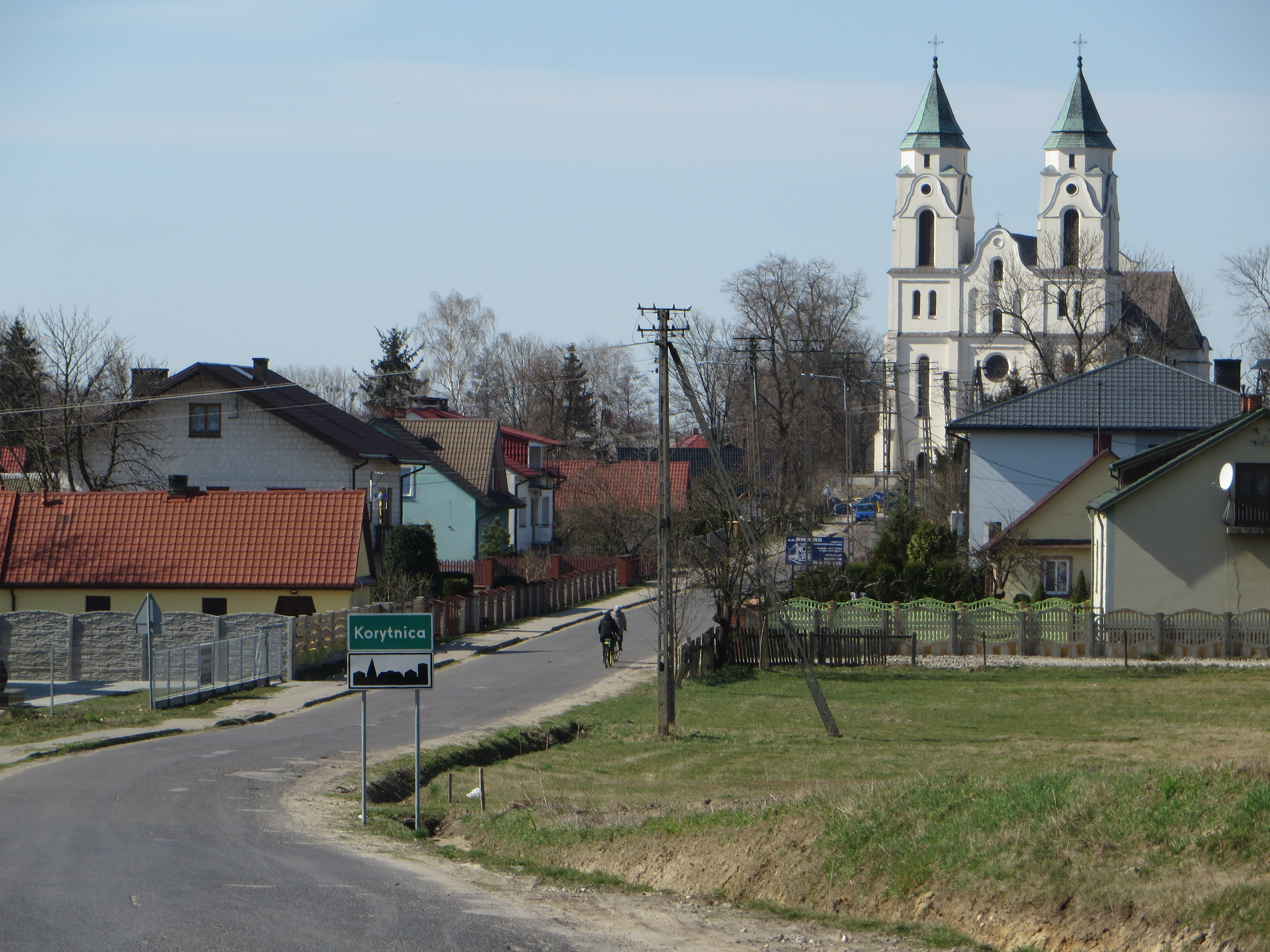

- Location within Poland
- Coordinates: 51°43′12″N 21°46′37″E
- Country: Poland
- Voivodeship: Masovian
- County: Garwolin
- Gmina: Trojanów
- Time zone: UTC+1 (CET)
  - Summer (DST): UTC+2 (CEST)
- Vehicle registration: WG

Korytnica [kɔrɨtˈnit͡sa] is a village in the administrative district of Gmina Trojanów, within Garwolin County, Masovian Voivodeship, in east-central Poland.

== History ==
Korytnica was a private village of Polish nobility, administratively located in the Stężyca County in the Sandomierz Voivodeship in the Lesser Poland Province of the Kingdom of Poland.

Three Polish citizens were murdered by Nazi Germany in the village during World War II.
