= Wola Życka =

- Village
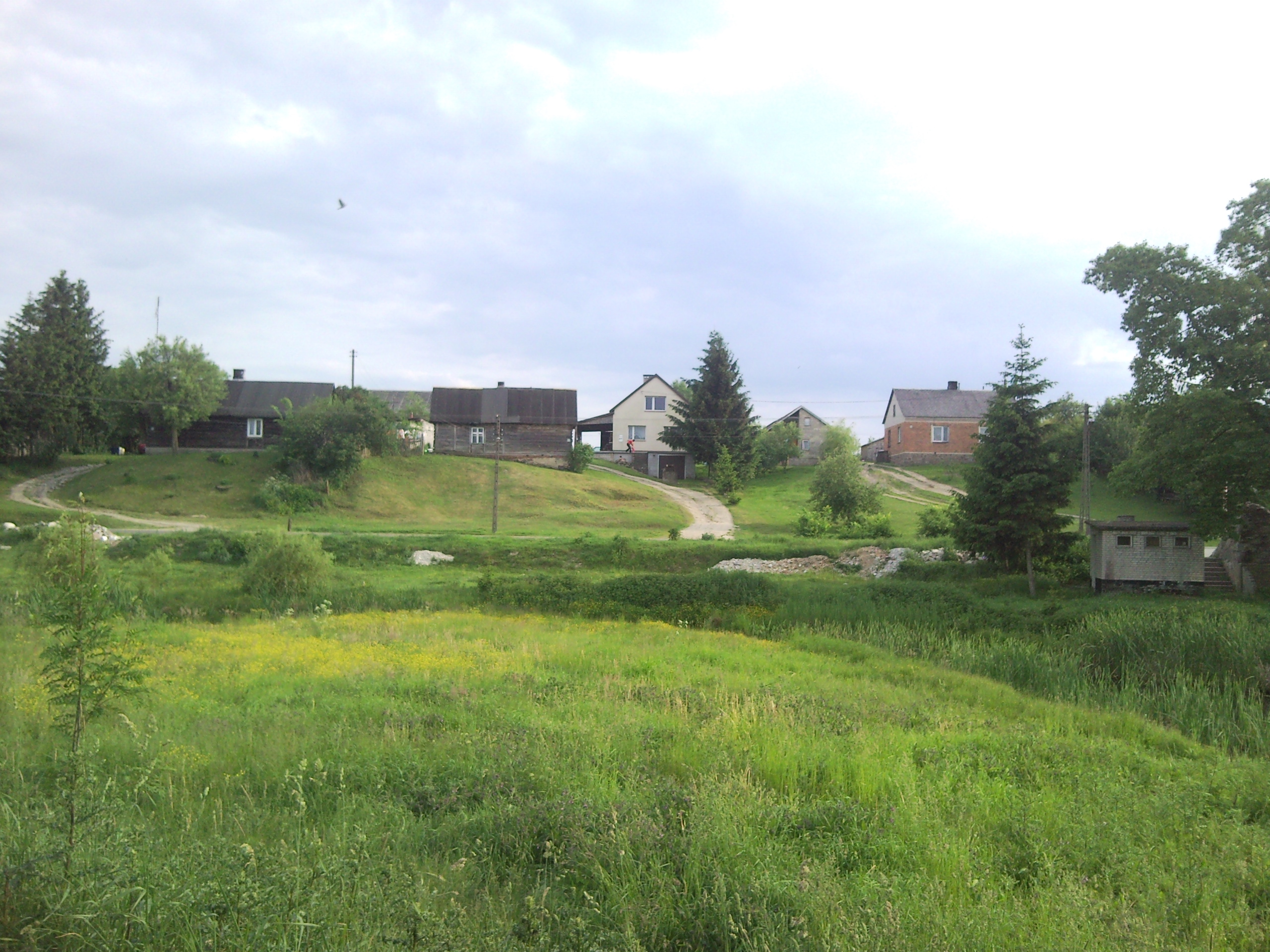

- Location within Poland
- Coordinates: 51°41′N 21°44′E
- Country: Poland
- Voivodeship: Masovian
- County: Garwolin
- Gmina: Trojanów
- Time zone: UTC+1 (CET)
  - Summer (DST): UTC+2 (CEST)
- Vehicle registration: WG

Wola Życka [ˈvɔla ˈʐɨt͡ska] is a village in the administrative district of Gmina Trojanów, within Garwolin County, Masovian Voivodeship, in east-central Poland.

== History ==
Wola Życka was a royal village of the Kingdom of Poland, administratively located in the Stężyca County in the Sandomierz Voivodeship in the Lesser Poland Province.

According to the 1921 census, the village with the adjacent settlement had a population of 294, entirely Polish by nationality.

Three Polish citizens were murdered by Nazi Germany in the village during World War II.
