= History of Christianity in Poland =

Poland - Christian History

The history of Christianity in Poland started in the reign of Mieszko I of Poland, who was baptised in 966.

== Before conversion ==
Gallus Anonymus recorded a story about "two strangers" who visited the home of Piast, the legendary forefather of the Polish royal family, after Prince Popiel had ill-received them. Piast was celebrating the first haircut of his son, Siemowit, and the two visitors blessed Siemowit and foretold his family's emergence. In Polish historiography, the two wanderers have been identified as Irish monks or Moravian missionaries, but nothing proves the validity of these theories.

According to the Life of St Methodius, Methodius suggested a chieftain of the Vistulans—a Slavic tribe inhabiting the region along the upper courses of the river Vistula—that he should voluntarily receive baptism in his own land otherwise he would be baptized "as a prisoner in a foreign land". Historian A. P. Vlasto writes that the holy man's prophecy was fulfilled after the chieftain was forced to accept the suzerainty of Moravia or was captured. Inscriptions on two fragmentary ceramic objects unearthed at Podebłocie have been interpreted as the abbreviation of the Greek text "Iesus Chrestos Nika" by Tadeusz Wasilewski and other scholars, but their view has not been universally accepted. According to Przemysław Urbańczyk, no archaeological evidence of Christian communities in Poland before the 960s has been presented.

== Conversion and pagan revolts ==
Mieszko I—who was Siemowit's great-grandson, according to Gallus Anonymus—was the first Polish ruler known from contemporaneous sources. In an attempt to enter into an alliance with Boleslaus I, Duke of Bohemia, he decided to marry the Duke's Christian daughter, Dobrava in 964 or 965. According to the nearly contemporaneous Thietmar of Merseburg, Dobrava persuaded her husband to convert Christianity one or three years later. His conversion, known as the baptism of Poland, was a milestone event in Polish history.

== Sources ==
=== Primary sources ===
- Ottonian Germany: The Chronicon of Thietmar of Merseburg (Translated and annotated by David A. Warner) (2001). Manchester University Press. ISBN 0-7190-4926-1.
- The Deeds of the Princes of the Poles (Translated and annotated by Paul W. Knoll and Frank Schaer with a preface by Thomas N. Bisson) (2003). CEU Press. ISBN 963-9241-40-7.
- "The Life of Methodius" (1983). In Medieval Slavic Lives of Saints and Princes (Marvin Kantor) [Michigan Slavic Translation 5]. University of Michigan. pp. 97–138. ISBN 0-930042-44-1.

=== Secondary sources ===
- Barford, P. M. (2001). The Early Slavs: Culture and Society in Early Medieval Eastern Europe. Cornell University Press. ISBN 0-8014-3977-9.
- Berend, Nora; Urbańczyk, Przemysław; Wiszewski, Przemysław (2013). Central Europe in the High Middle Ages: Bohemia, Hungary and Poland, c. 900-c. 1300. Cambridge University Press. ISBN 978-0-521-78156-5.
- Manteuffel, Tadeusz (1982). The Formation of the Polish State: The Period of Ducal Rule, 963–1194 (Translated and with an Introduction by Andrew Gorski). Wayne State University Press. ISBN 0-8143-1682-4.
- Sedlar, Jean W. (1994). East Central Europe in the Middle Ages, 1000–1500. University of Washington Press. ISBN 0-295-97290-4.
- Urbańczyk, Przemysław; Rosik, Stanisław (2007). "The kingdom of Poland, with an Appendix on Polabia and Pomerania between paganism and Christianity". In Berend, Nora (ed.). Christianization and the Rise of Christian Monarchy: Scandinavia, Central Europe and Rus', c.900-1200. Cambridge University Press. pp. 263–318. ISBN 978-0-521-87616-2.
- Vlasto, A. P. (1970). The Entry of the Slavs into Christendom: An Introduction to the Medieval History of the Slavs. Cambridge University Press. ISBN 978-0-521-10758-7.
