= Trojanów, Garwolin County =

Trojanów
- Village
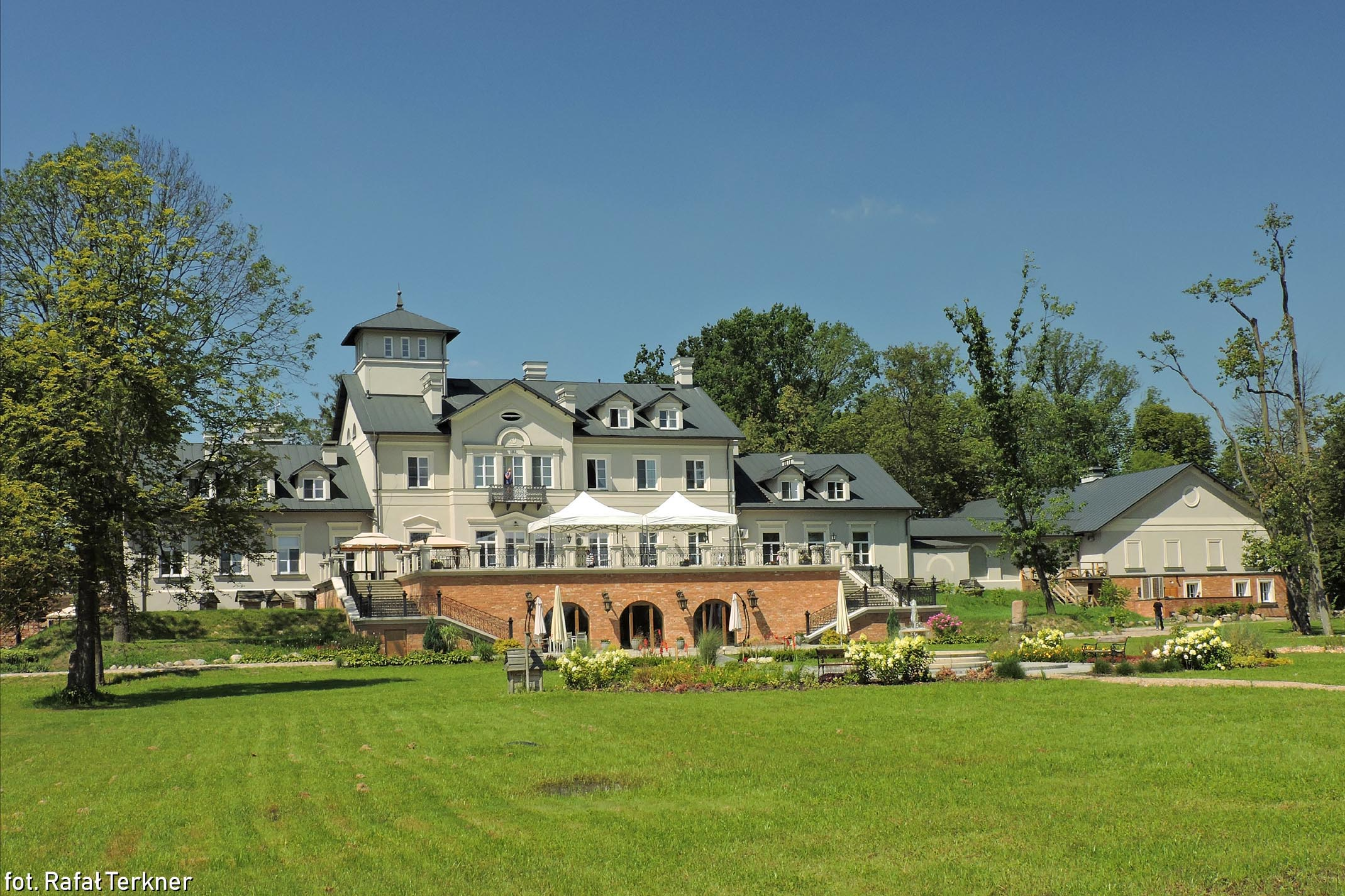

- Location within Poland
- Coordinates: 51°41′41″N 21°49′7″E
- Country: Poland
- Voivodeship: Masovian
- County: Garwolin
- Gmina: Trojanów

Population
  - Total: 686
- Time zone: UTC+1 (CET)
  - Summer (DST): UTC+2 (CEST)
- Vehicle registration: WG

Trojanów [trɔˈjanuf] is a village in Garwolin County, Masovian Voivodeship, in east-central Poland. It is the seat of the gmina (administrative district) called Gmina Trojanów.

== History ==
Trojanów was a private village of Polish nobility, administratively located in the Stężyca County in the Sandomierz Voivodeship in the Lesser Poland Province of the Kingdom of Poland.

According to the 1921 census, the village with the adjacent manor farm and settlement had a population of 547, 99.1% Polish by nationality and 97.0% Catholic by confession.

23 Polish citizens were murdered by Nazi Germany in the village during World War II.
