= Marian Bernaciak =

Polish military officer

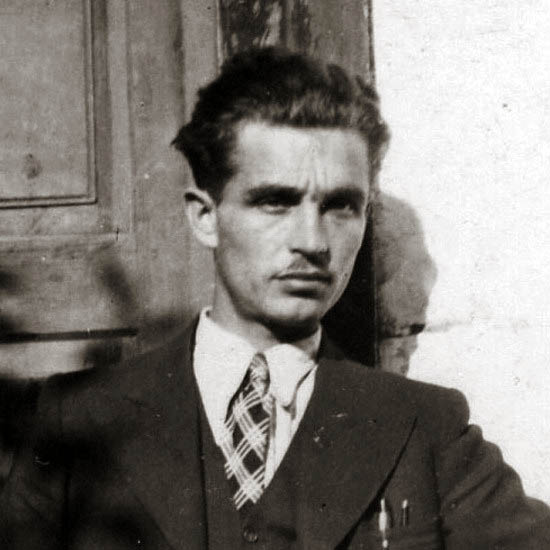
- Nickname: Orlik (Little Eagle)
- Born: March 6, 1917; Zalesie, Poland
- Died: June 24, 1946 (aged 29) Piotrówek, Poland
- Service years: 1939-1946
- Rank: Major
- Conflicts: World War II, Anti-Soviet resistance
- Awards: Ribbon Krzyż Walecznych Krzyż Armii Krajowej

Marian Bernaciak (nom de guerre "Dymek" (Little Smoke) or "Orlik" (Little Eagle)) (March 6, 1917 – June 24, 1946) was a lieutenant in the Polish Army, a member of ZWZ and the Home Army, a major and a legendary leader of an underground partisan unit of WiN in the Lublin region.

== Early life ==
Marian was born to a peasant family, as the son of Michał and Maria (née Bliźniak). In 1937, he finished the Czartoryski gimnazjum in Puławy. For his compulsory military service he attended the Mazowiecka Szkoła Podchorążych Rezerwy Artylerii (The Mazovian School for Cadets of the Artillery Reserve) in Zambrów which he finished with the rank of corporal. He was assigned to the Second Regiment of Heavy Artillery. He worked in the post office in Sobolew. In September 1939 he was mobilized and during the German invasion of Poland he fought as a second lieutenant of the reserves. During the defense of Włodzimierz Wołyński he was captured and imprisoned by the Soviets.

== In the anti-German resistance ==
In 1940 he became involved in underground activity as part of ZWZ and later the Home Army (AK). He was the head of Kedyw's Sub-region "A" (around Dęblin and Ryki) in the AK region of Puławy. From the fall of 1943 on he was sought after by the Gestapo and as a result remained in hiding. It was at this point that he changed his conspiratorial name from "Dymek" to "Orlik". On 20, November, 1943 he created a flying column of partisans of which he became the leader. In May 1944 his group received the conspiratorial code name "OP I/15 Regiment of AK Infantry Wilki" ("Wolves"). He carried out more than twenty military actions and attacks against the occupying Germans. Thanks to his group in Dęblin, during Operation Tempest in July 1944, several military and economic objects were saved from destruction by retreating German forces and the local population was saved from expulsion or extermination. On July 27, 1944, his unit independently captured and took control of Ryki. In August 1944 Bernaciak, together with about 350 partisan soldiers began a march in an attempt to aid the insurgents fighting the Nazis in the Warsaw Uprising, on the orders of AK central command. However, this endeavor was unsuccessful as the Soviets began disarming and attacking AK units at this time.

== In the anti-communist resistance ==
In 1944/45 he was in danger of being arrested by the Soviets and as a result decided to disband his unit and go into hiding. He was wanted by the NKVD. In March 1945 he recreated his group, mostly out of AK soldiers who were threatened with arrest by the new communist authorities. Initially he accepted the command of Armed Forces Delegation for Poland and later, beginning in September, he joined the anti-communist Freedom and Independence (WiN) movement.

One of his most famous actions took place on April 24, 1945, when Orlik's men attacked and captured the UB office in Puławy, freeing 107 political prisoners (mostly former AK members). Another famous engagement took place on 24 May 1945 near Las Stocki, when together with a unit of fifty men under lieutenant Czesław Szlendak ("Maks") Bernaciak won a battle against a force of 680 soldiers (KBW, UB and NKVD) which was equipped with three armored cars. After a fight that lasted a whole day, between 30 and 70 communist soldiers and militia had been killed. This was the largest battle fought in the post-World War II period between the forces of the Polish and Soviet governments and anti-communist partisans in Poland.

In the fall of 1945 he was made the commander of all WiN units operating in the Regional Inspectorate "Puławy". During this time he was promoted to the rank of major (according to some sources, captain). The anti-communist partisan group led by him, one of the largest in the Lublin region (between 160 and 200 soldiers) carried out many military actions against the communist authorities, the communist secret police (UB), units of Polish People's Army and the Milicja. According to released NKVD documents, as well as an investigation by the Polish Institute of National Remembrance in 2006, Bernaciak was considered sufficiently dangerous by the Soviets that they refused to let Polish communists "handle the problem on their own" and insisted on becoming involved themselves.

His partisans operated as a single group until July 1945. However, afterward, due to the increased presence of regular Polish army and UB security units in the region, Bernaciak was forced to change his tactics. He divided his grouping into small platoons and squads which could stay hidden in various villages while being supported by the WiN network. At the same time, communications were maintained between them so that the overall group could quickly mobilize and carry out bigger operations. The approach changed once again in 1946 when the larger group was reformed and then divided into two sub-regiments. The first one operated under the leadership of Wacław Kuchnio, "Spokojny" (Peaceful), in the north of the Puławy region, while the second, operating in the south was under the command of Zygmunt Wilczyńsk, "Żuk" (Beetle).

The source of Bernaciak's successes at this time lay in his leadership ability and the willingness to change his tactics in response to a changing situation. Thanks to his efforts, his patrols and diversion squads, in addition to military actions, also carried out intelligence work, gathered information on the political and social situation in the world and in the region, and published informational pamphlets, communiques, and political manifestos. The best known of these were Orlik's appeal to the public on the occasion of the 1946 referendum and the pamphlet "The Pulawski Katyn" (a reference to the Katyn massacre).

== Death ==
In June 1946, Bernaciak killed himself after being corned by the police.

== Legacy ==
Bernaciak never married or started a family because, according to him, "there was no time for that".

In his home village of Zalesie, a monument was erected after the fall of communism in 1989, commemorating him with an inscription, a cross and a symbol of "Poland Fighting".

On 25 June 2006, in Piotrówek, the President of Poland, Lech Kaczyński led a ceremony honoring the memory of Marian Bernaciak, "Orlik" and awarded him the Grand Cross of Polonia Restituta posthumously.
