= Babice, Masovian Voivodeship =

Babice
- Village
- Location within Poland
- Coordinates: 51°42′N 21°52′E
- Country: Poland
- Voivodeship: Masovian
- County: Garwolin
- Gmina: Trojanów
- Time zone: UTC+1 (CET)
  - Summer (DST): UTC+2 (CEST)
- Vehicle registration: WG

Babice (Polish pronunciation: [baˈbit͡sɛ]) is a village in the administrative district of Gmina Trojanów, within Garwolin County, Masovian Voivodeship, in east-central Poland.

== History ==
Babice was a royal village of the Kingdom of Poland, administratively located in the Stężyca County in the Sandomierz Voivodeship in the Lesser Poland Province.

According to the 1921 census, the village with the adjacent settlement had a population of 451, entirely Polish by nationality.

Six Polish citizens were murdered by Nazi Germany in the village during World War II.
