= Mika railway station =

Railway station in Masovian Voivodeship, Poland

Mika
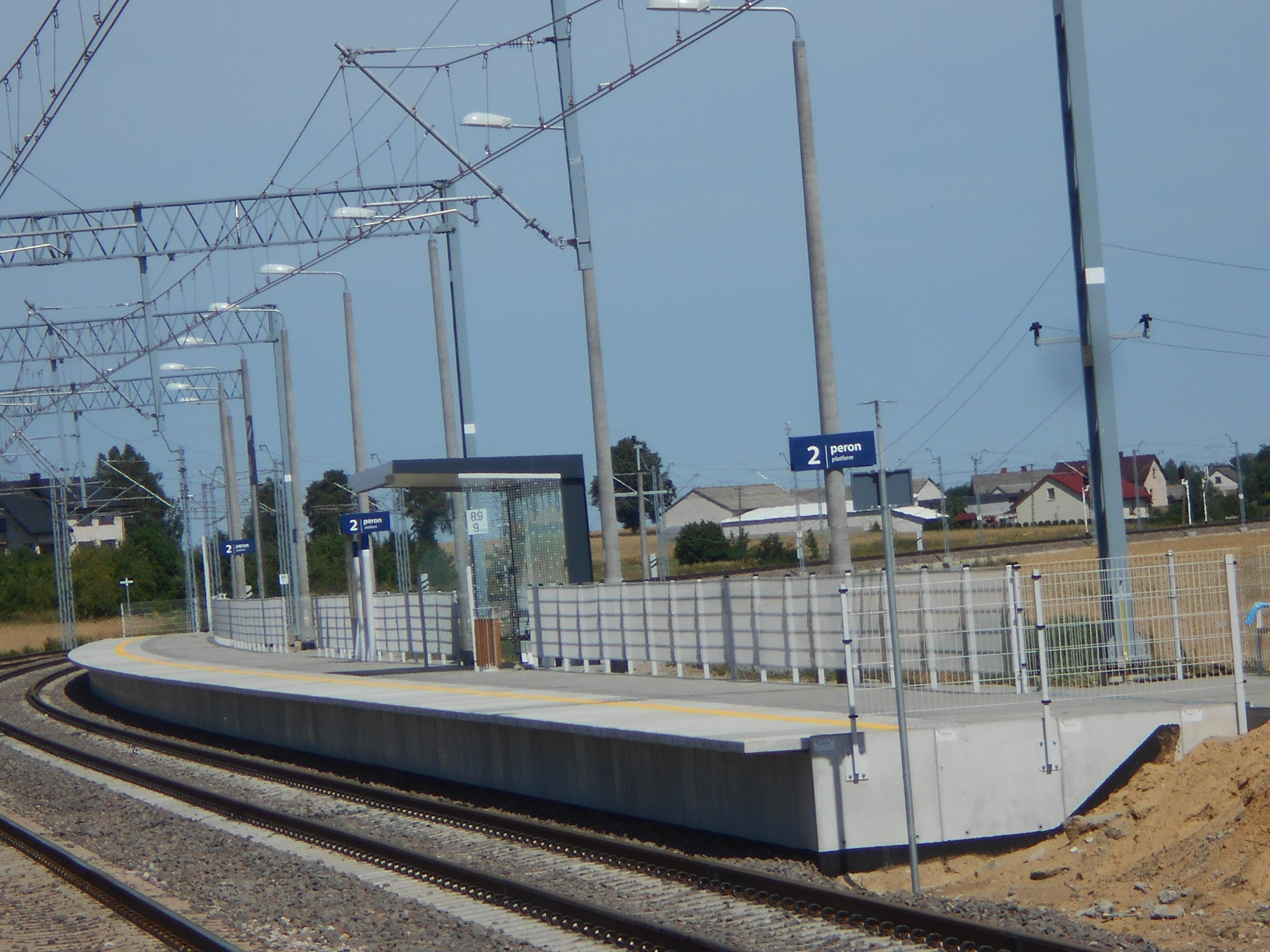
- Mika railway station

General information
- Location: Mika, Trojanów, Garwolin, Masovian; Poland
- Coordinates: 51.6727683°N 21.748947°E
- System: Rail Station
- Owner: Polskie Koleje Państwowe S.A.

Services
| Preceding station | Masovian Railways | Following station |
|---|---|---|
| Wygoda towards Warszawa Zachodnia | R7 | Życzyn towards Dęblin |
Location

Mika railway station is a railway station at Mika, Garwolin, Masovian, Poland. It is served by Masovian Railways.
