= Gmina Stężyca =

Gmina Stężyca may refer to either of the following rural administrative districts in Poland:

- Gmina Stężyca, Pomeranian Voivodeship
- Gmina Stężyca, Lublin Voivodeship
