= Kozice =

Kozice may refer to:

- Kozice, Stolac, a village near Stolac, Bosnia and Herzegovina
- Kozice (Gornji Vakuf), a village near Gornji Vakuf-Uskoplje, Bosnia and Herzegovina
- Kozice, Croatia, a village near Slatina, Croatia
- Kozice, Garwolin County, a village in Masovian Voivodeship, east-central Poland
- Kozice, Gostynin County, a village in Masovian Voivodeship, central Poland
- Kozice, Kočevje, a former village in the Municipality of Kočevje, Slovenia
- Kozice, Lower Silesian Voivodeship, a village in south-west Poland
- Kozice, Sierpc County, a village in Masovian Voivodeship, north-central Poland
- Kozice (Wałbrzych), a city district of Wałbrzych in Lower Silesia, Poland
