= Prażmów, Lublin Voivodeship =

Prażmów
- Village
- Location within Poland
- Coordinates: 51°34′28″N 21°41′55″E
- Country: Poland
- Voivodeship: Lublin
- County: Ryki
- Gmina: Stężyca

Prażmów [ˈpraʐmuf] is a village in the administrative district of Gmina Stężyca, within Ryki County, Lublin Voivodeship, in eastern Poland.
