= Więcków =

- Village
- Location within Poland
- Coordinates: 51°40′N 21°50′E
- Country: Poland
- Voivodeship: Masovian
- County: Garwolin
- Gmina: Trojanów

Więcków [ˈvjɛnt͡skuf] is a village in the administrative district of Gmina Trojanów, within Garwolin County, Masovian Voivodeship, in east-central Poland.
