= Nowa Rokitnia =

- Village
- Location within Poland
- Coordinates: 51°37′42″N 21°47′28″E
- Country: Poland
- Voivodeship: Lublin
- County: Ryki
- Gmina: Stężyca

Nowa Rokitnia [ˈnɔva rɔˈkitɲa] is a village in the administrative district of Gmina Stężyca, within Ryki County, Lublin Voivodeship, in eastern Poland.
