= Zielonka, Ryki County =

Zielonka
- Village
- Location within Poland
- Coordinates: 51°38′N 21°49′E
- Country: Poland
- Voivodeship: Lublin
- County: Ryki
- Gmina: Stężyca
- Population: 136

Zielonka [ʑɛˈlɔŋka] is a village in the administrative district of Gmina Stężyca, within Ryki County, Lublin Voivodeship, in eastern Poland.
