= Pawłowice, Lublin Voivodeship =

Pawłowice
- Village
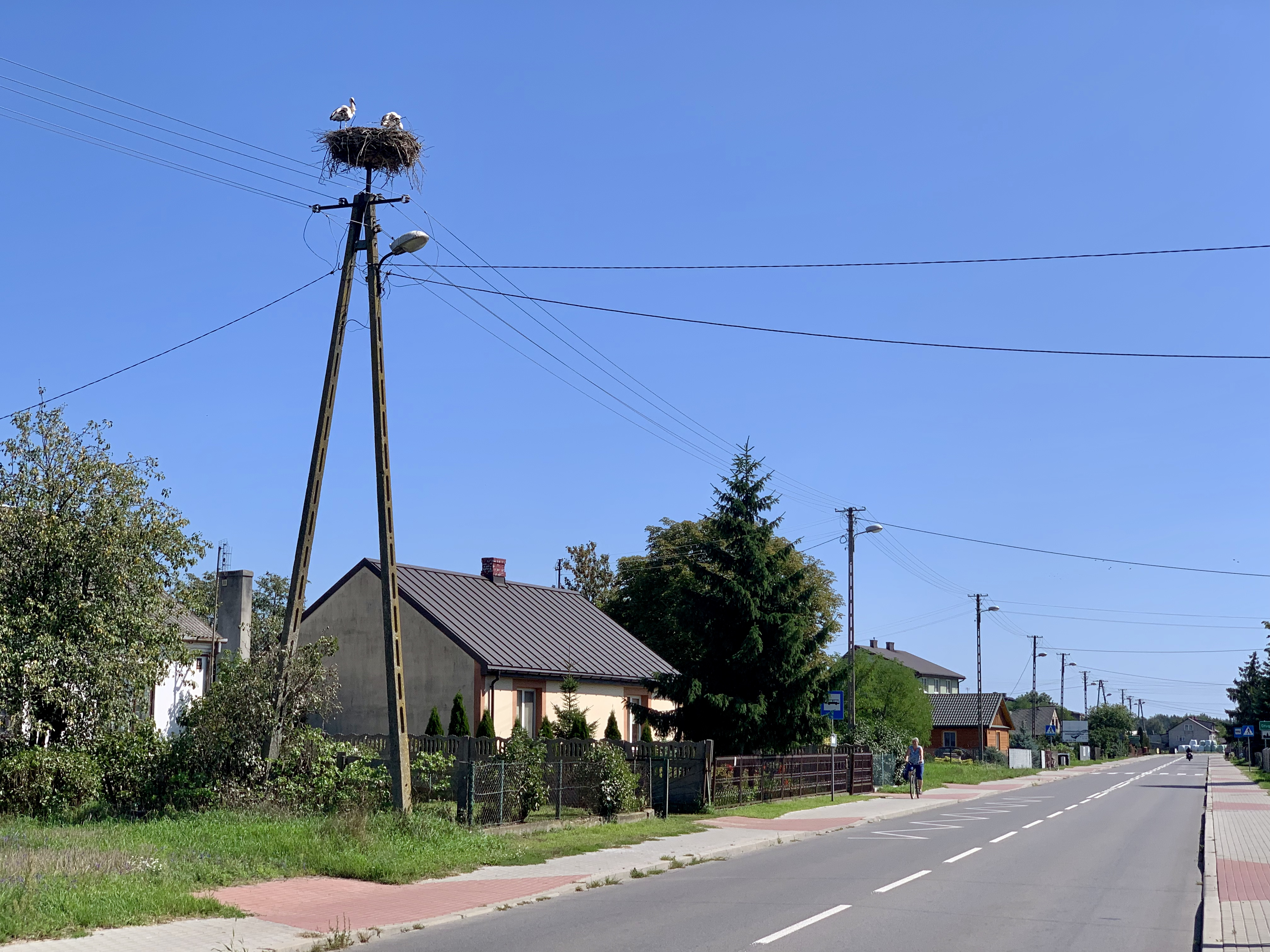

- Location within Poland
- Coordinates: 51°36′24″N 21°40′30″E
- Country: Poland
- Voivodeship: Lublin
- County: Ryki
- Gmina: Stężyca
- Postal code: 08-540

Pawłowice [pavwɔˈvit͡sɛ] is a village in the administrative district of Gmina Stężyca, within Ryki County, Lublin, Poland, in eastern Poland.
