= Paprotnia, Lublin Voivodeship =

Paprotnia
- Village
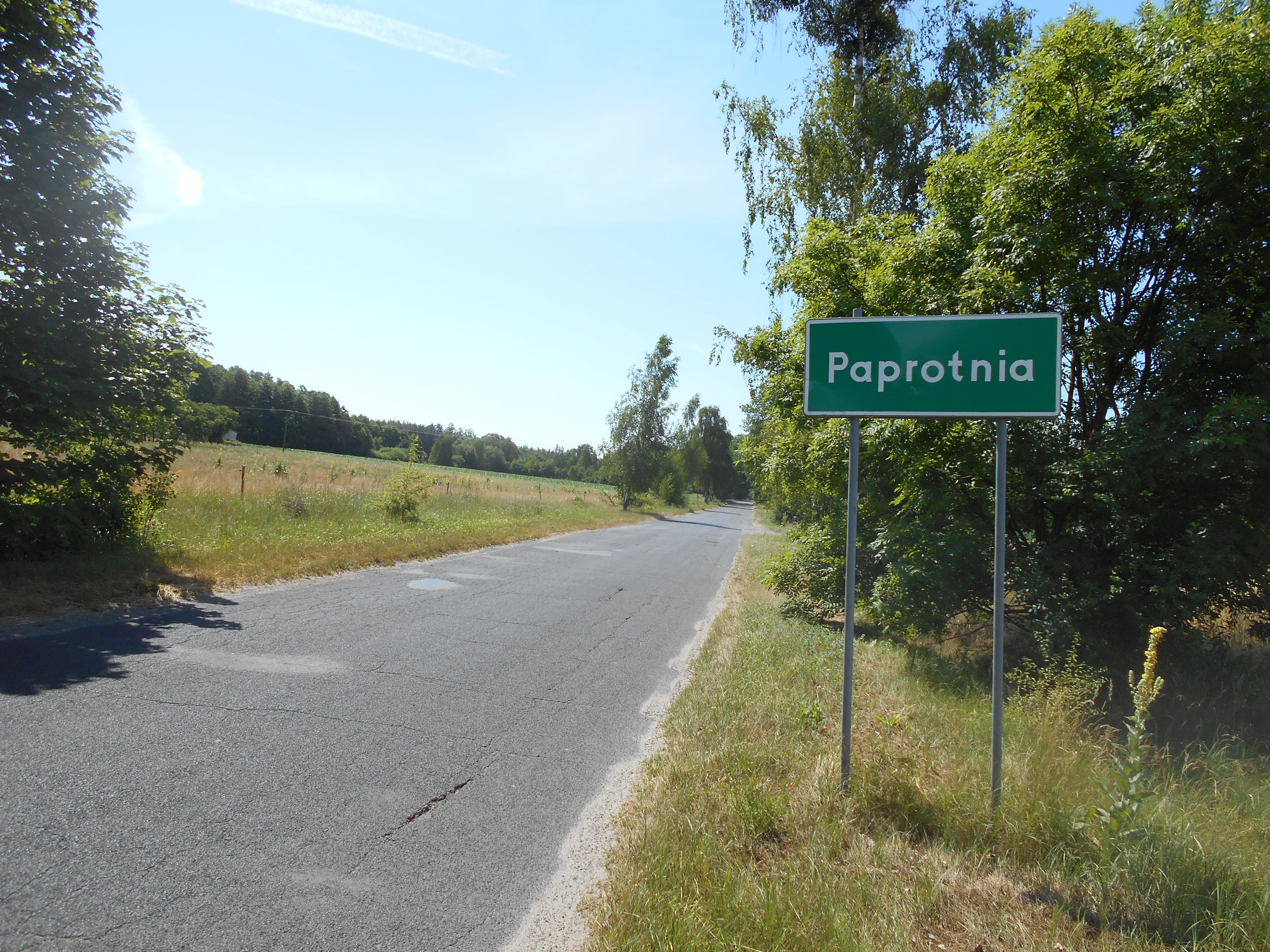

- Location within Poland
- Coordinates: 51°37′53″N 21°39′44″E
- Country: Poland
- Voivodeship: Lublin
- County: Ryki
- Gmina: Stężyca
- Time zone: UTC+1 (CET)
  - Summer (DST): UTC+2 (CEST)

Paprotnia [paˈprɔtɲa] is a village in the administrative district of Gmina Stężyca, within Ryki County, Lublin Voivodeship, in eastern Poland.

== History ==
Five Polish citizens were murdered by Nazi Germany in the village during World War II.
