= Skruda, Garwolin County =

Skruda
- Village
- Location within Poland
- Coordinates: 51°41′42″N 21°57′25″E
- Country: Poland
- Voivodeship: Masovian
- County: Garwolin
- Gmina: Trojanów
- Population (approx.): 90

Skruda [ˈskruda] is a village in the administrative district of Gmina Trojanów, within Garwolin County, Masovian Voivodeship, in east-central Poland.
