= Cabman's Adventure =

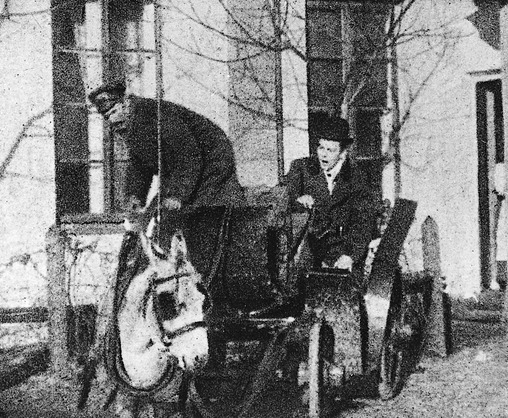
- A scene from Cabman's Adventure, in which a cabman realises his horses have been replaced by a donkey.
- Directed by: Kazimierz Prószyński
- Screenplay by: Kazimierz Prószyński
- Produced by: Kazimierz Prószyński
- Starring: Kazimierz Junosza-Stępowski; Władysław Neubelt (presumed)
- Cinematography: Kazimierz Prószyński
- Production company: Towarzystwo Udziałowe Pleograf
- Release date: September 1902
- Country: Russian Empire

Cabman's Adventure (Polish: Przygoda dorożkarza) is a 1902 silent comedy short film made by Kazimierz Prószyński. It starred Kazimierz Junosza-Stępowski and presumably Władysław Neubelt. Released in September 1902, it is one of the oldest known narrative films made in Poland. The film plot focuses around a prank, in which horses of a cabman are replaced with a donkey, while he remains asleep in a horse-drawn carriage. It was filmed in the city of Warsaw, then in the Kingdom of Poland within the Russian Empire, and now part of the Republic of Poland.

== Plot ==
The driver of a horse-drawn carriage falls asleep in his vehicle. While he is asleep, a group of people, jokingly takes his horses and replace them with a donkey. The driver is woken up by a passenger and is flabbergasted by the change.

== Cast ==
- Kazimierz Junosza-Stępowski as a passenger
- Władysław Neubelt (presumably) as a cabman

== Production and release ==
Cabman's Adventure was written and directed by Kazimierz Prószyński. It was filmed by him in 1902 on a biopleograph, a filming device of his own invention. The film was produced by his company, Towarzystwo Udziałowe Pleograf, and created in the city of Warsaw in the Kingdom of Poland within the Russian Empire. It was an experimental film and one of the first films made by Prószyński. The film features two characters, a passenger played by Kazimierz Junosza-Stępowski, and a cabman, whose actor's name remains uncertain, though it is presumed to be Władysław Neubelt. It was the former's film debut. The film was released in September 1902, becoming one of the first narrative films made in Poland, as well as one of the oldest films made in the country. Around the same time, Prószyński also realesead another short comedy film, titled The Return of a Merry Fellow, which is now considered lost.
