= Budziska, Garwolin County =

Budziska
- Village
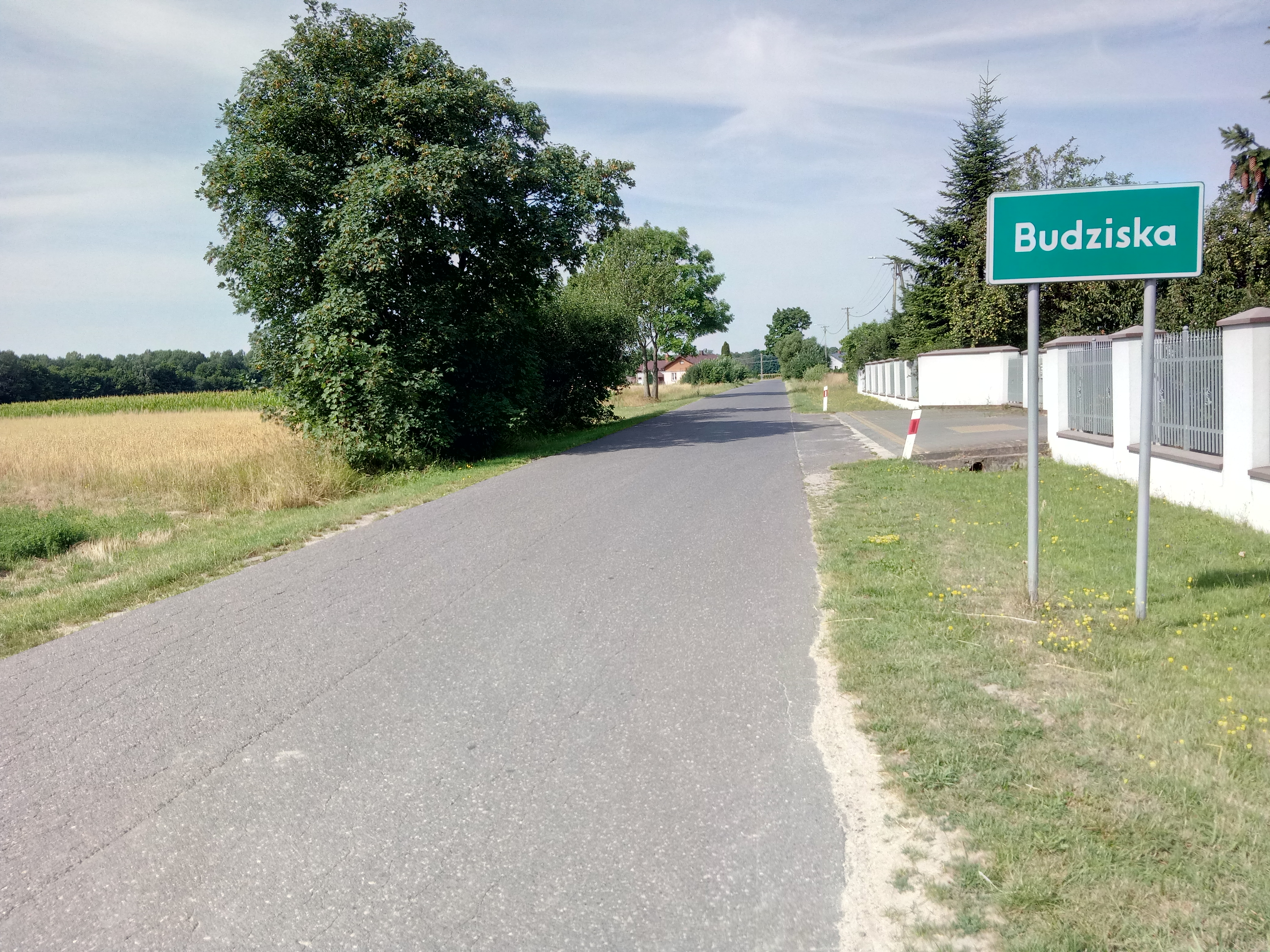

- Location within Poland
- Coordinates: 51°45′34″N 21°49′53″E
- Country: Poland
- Voivodeship: Masovian
- County: Garwolin
- Gmina: Trojanów
- Time zone: UTC+1 (CET)
  - Summer (DST): UTC+2 (CEST)
- Vehicle registration: WG

Budziska [buˈd͡ʑiska] is a village in the administrative district of Gmina Trojanów, within Garwolin County, Masovian Voivodeship, in east-central Poland.

== History ==
Six Polish citizens were murdered by Nazi Germany in the village during World War II.
