= Żabianka, Masovian Voivodeship =

Żabianka
- Village
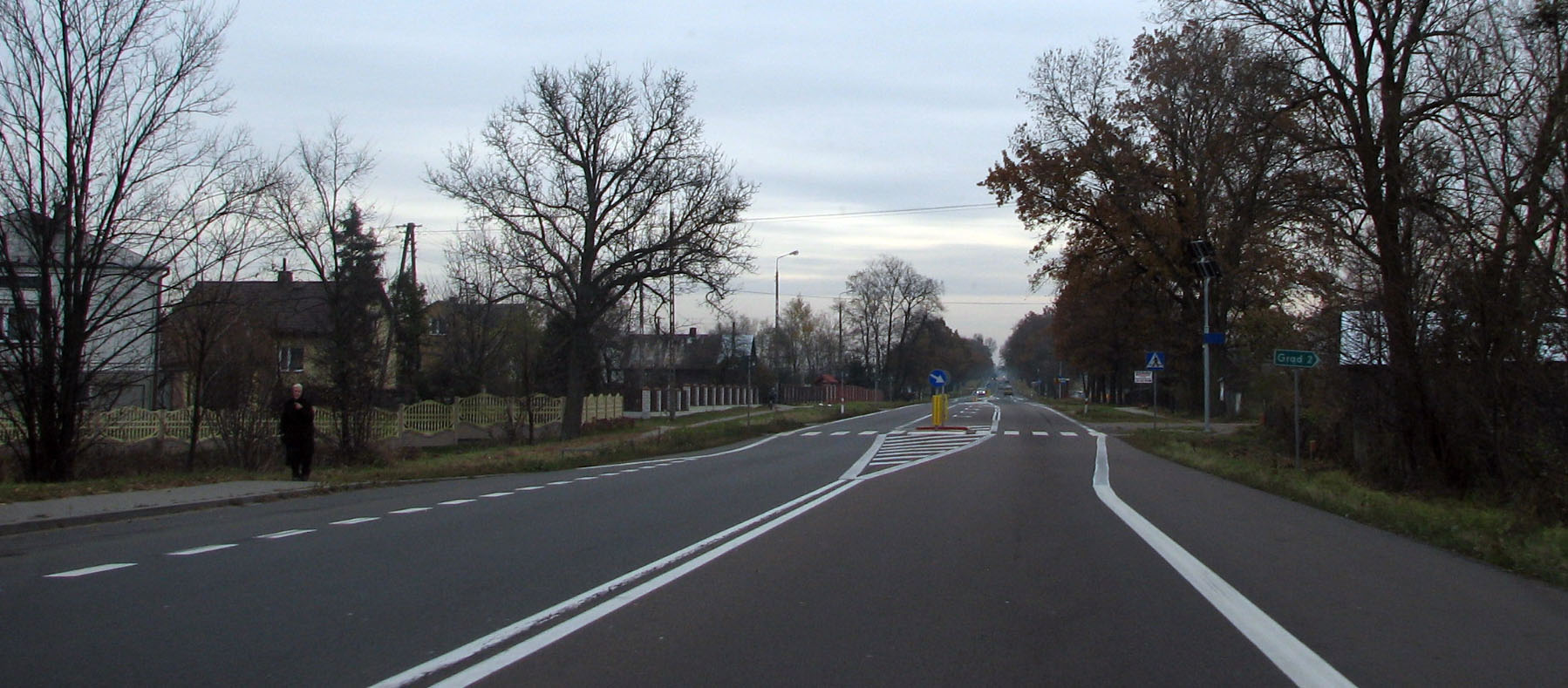

- Location within Poland
- Coordinates: 51°41′20″N 21°50′32″E
- Country: Poland
- Voivodeship: Masovian
- County: Garwolin
- Gmina: Trojanów

Żabianka [ʐaˈbjaŋka] is a village in the administrative district of Gmina Trojanów, within Garwolin County, Masovian Voivodeship, in east-central Poland.
