= Krukówka, Lublin Voivodeship =

Krukówka
- Village
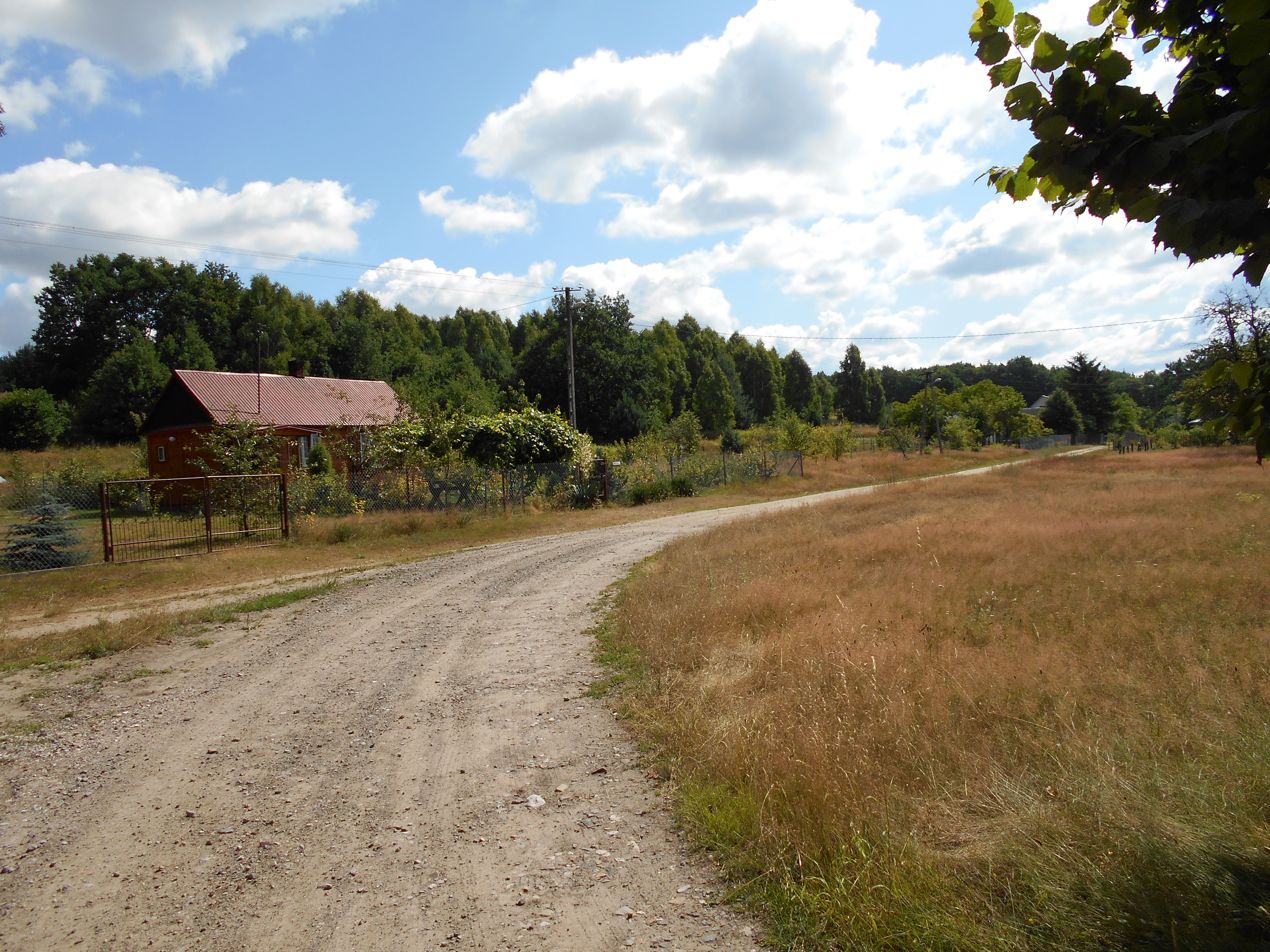
- Unpaved road in Krukówka

- Location within Poland
- Coordinates: 51°35′50″N 21°50′40″E
- Country: Poland
- Voivodeship: Lublin
- County: Ryki
- Gmina: Stężyca

Krukówka [kruˈkufka] is a village in the administrative district of Gmina Stężyca, within Ryki County, Lublin Voivodeship, in eastern Poland.
