= 2024 France railway arson attacks =

Arson attacks in Paris during 2024 summer Olympics

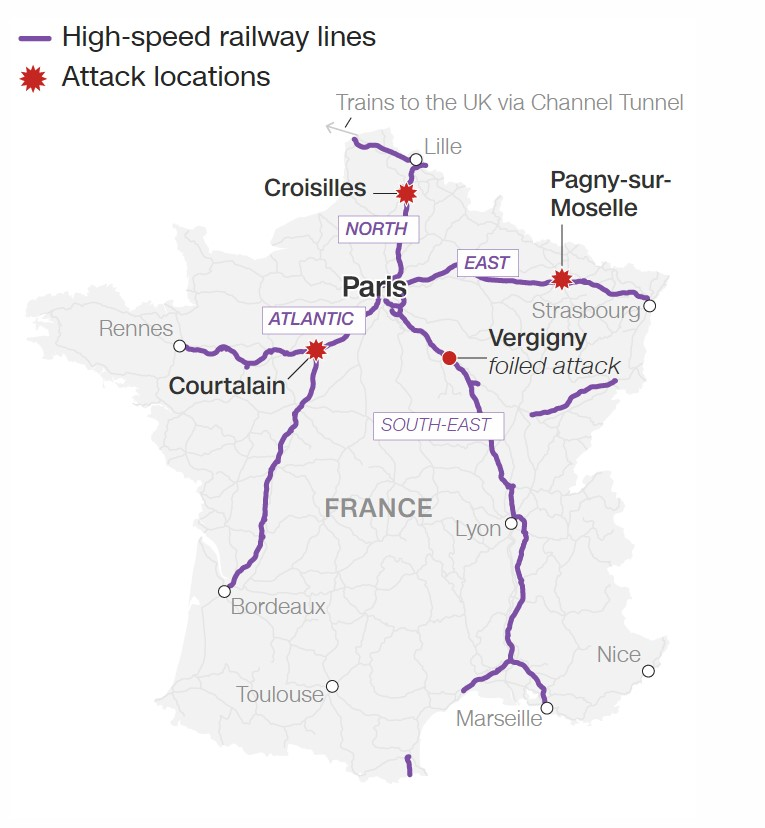
- High-speed train lines targeted by the arson attacks
- Location: LGV Atlantique; LGV Nord; LGV Est; LGV Sud-Est
- Date: 26 July 2024; 01:00 AM – 05:30 AM (CEST (UTC+02:00))
- Attack type: Arson
- Deaths: None
- Injuries: None
- Perpetrator: Unknown

On 26 July 2024, the day of the opening ceremony of the 2024 Summer Olympics, a series of arson attacks damaged the LGV Atlantique, Nord, and Est lines of the French high-speed railway system. International and domestic rail services were widely disrupted, with around 800,000 passengers affected. There was also an attempted attack on LGV Sud-Est line, though it was interrupted by TGV maintenance workers who happened to be on site.

== Background ==
A previous attack was avoided on 8 May during the arrival of the Olympic flame in Marseille, when police found four incendiary devices on the LGV Méditerranée line between Aix and Marseille.

== Attacks ==
Four signal boxes along the lines connecting Paris with cities such as Lille in the north, Bordeaux in the west and Strasbourg in the east were damaged, while an attack on the LGV Sud-Est line was interrupted. Eurostar later confirmed that they had cancelled one in four trains as the arson attacks caused high-speed rail disruption. Apart from international trains, domestic rail services were also widely disrupted. It is estimated that 800,000 passengers were affected.

=== Sabotage sites ===
Locations of the arson attack sites in France
(Source: Eurostar)
1. LGV Atlantique: near Arrou (neighbouring town of Courtalain)
2. LGV Est Européenne: between the Meuse TGV station and Lamorville
3. LGV Est Européenne: near Pagny-sur-Moselle
4. LGV Nord: near Croisilles
5. LGV Sud-Est: near Vergigny, foiled by railway workers.

== Effects ==
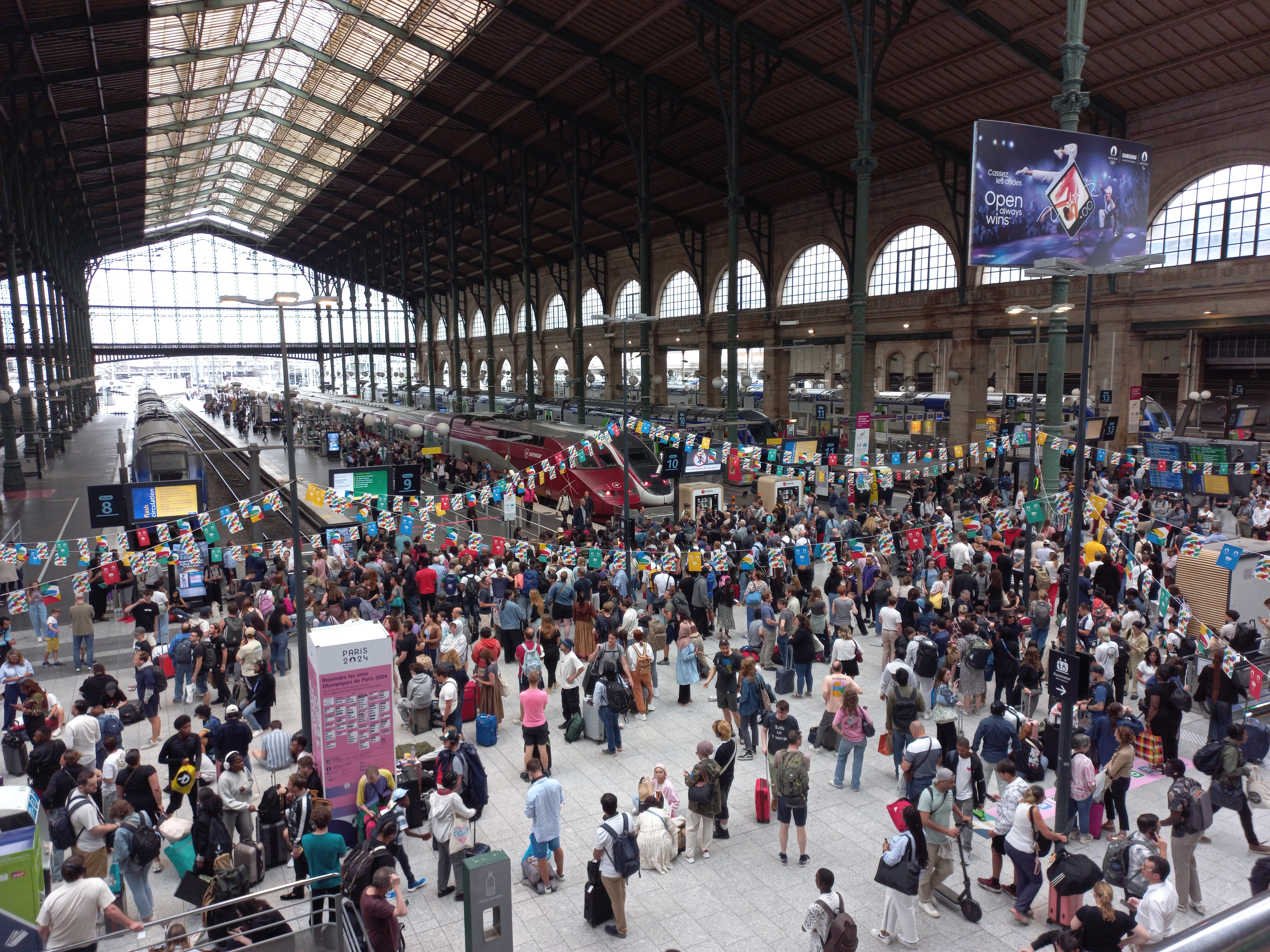
Crowds of passengers waiting for trains delayed by the attacks at Paris Gare du Nord station

Three high-speed lines were impacted:

- LGV Atlantique: two-thirds of trains were not running.
- LGV Est Européenne: delays of around one and a half hours were reported, but all trains were running. Normal resumption of traffic was expected by 27 July.
- LGV Nord: delays of around one hour and some trains cancelled, with normal resumption of traffic planned by 29 July.

Eurostar was forced to cancel a quarter of its trains from 26 to 28 July. The trains that were running were diverted via conventional lines and ran at reduced speed, which extended the journey by approximately one and a half hours.

More than 800,000 travelers were directly impacted including 250,000 on 26 July.

British Prime Minister Keir Starmer originally planned to travel by Eurostar for the Olympics opening ceremony; however, he flew instead due to delays and cancellations caused by the arson attacks.

== Investigation ==
As of December 2024, no one has claimed responsibility for the attacks, and French authorities have not made any statements regarding the identities or motives of the perpetrators.

The Paris prosecutor opened a probe into a suspected bid to undermine "fundamental national interests". The intelligence services and law enforcement were mobilized to find and punish the perpetrators.

On 25 July 2024, the Israeli foreign minister Israel Katz had warned his French counterpart about a plot backed by Iranian terrorist proxies to derail the events. Iran denied these allegations before and after the attack.

On 28 July 2024, a man referred to as an "ultra-left militant" was arrested in northwest France after being found behaving suspiciously near a railway site, with keys to technical premises, pliers, a set of universal keys and literature "linked to the ultra-left" found within his car. However, there was no indication at the time of his arrest that he was linked to the earlier attacks.

== Reactions ==
The French sports minister, Amélie Oudéa-Castéra, expressed her outrage at the vandalism and said that targeting the games was equivalent to targeting France itself. French prime minister Gabriel Attal pledged to "find and punish" those responsible for "paralysing" the connectivity by sabotage attacks ahead of the evening's opening ceremony. The French transport minister, Patrice Vergriete, warned of "very serious consequences" for rail traffic throughout the weekend, with connections towards northern, eastern, and northwestern France being halved. France's Minister of the Interior Gérald Darmanin told the media that the methods employed were traditional of the ultra-left, providing a possible connection.

== See also ==
- Centennial Olympic Park bombing
- Munich massacre
- 2025 Russian railway sabotage in Poland
- 2026 Italian rail sabotage
