= Kruszyna, Garwolin County =

Kruszyna
- Village
- Location within Poland
- Coordinates: 51°39′N 21°39′E
- Country: Poland
- Voivodeship: Masovian
- County: Garwolin
- Gmina: Trojanów
- Population: 140

Kruszyna [kruˈʂɨna] is a village in the administrative district of Gmina Trojanów, within Garwolin County, Masovian Voivodeship, in east-central Poland.
