= Ruda, Garwolin County =

Ruda
- Village
- Location within Poland
- Coordinates: 51°40′07″N 21°51′22″E
- Country: Poland
- Voivodeship: Masovian
- County: Garwolin
- Gmina: Trojanów

Ruda [ˈruda] is a village in the administrative district of Gmina Trojanów, within Garwolin County, Masovian Voivodeship, in east-central Poland.
