= Stężyca, Lublin Voivodeship =

Stężyca
- Village
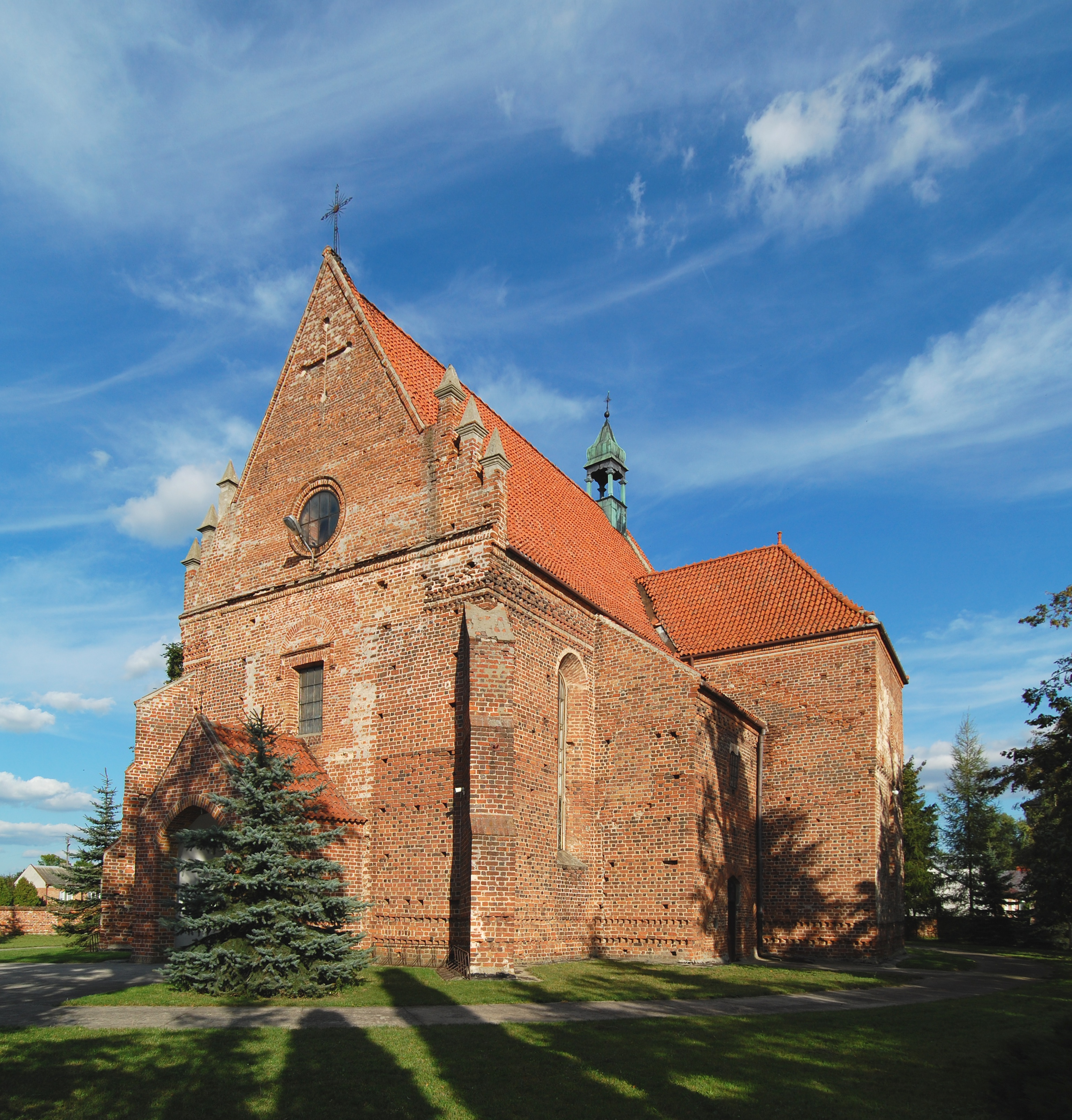
- Saint Martin Church

- Location within Poland
- Coordinates: 51°34′50″N 21°46′13″E
- Country: Poland
- Voivodeship: Lublin
- County: Ryki
- Gmina: Stężyca

Population
  - Total: 2,000
- Time zone: UTC+1 (CET)
  - Summer (DST): UTC+2 (CEST)

Stężyca [stɛ̃ˈʐɨt͡sa] is a village in Ryki County, Lublin Voivodeship, in eastern Poland. It is the seat of the gmina (administrative district) called Gmina Stężyca.

== History ==
The village is located in northeastern corner of the historic region of Lesser Poland. The settlement was first mentioned in the 12th century, for hundreds of centuries it was the center of the Stężyca Land. It was granted Magdeburg rights in 1330 from King Casimir the Great. In the early Kingdom of Poland and the Polish–Lithuanian Commonwealth, Stężyca was a major urban center and royal town in the Sandomierz Voivodeship in the Lesser Poland Province, and the seat of a powiat (county).

Following the Third Partition of Poland, it was annexed by Austria. After the Polish victory in the Austro-Polish War of 1809, it was regained by Poles and included within the short-lived Duchy of Warsaw, and after its dissolution, from 1815 to 1918 it was part of Russian-controlled Congress Poland. It lost its town charter in 1875, as a punishment for the unsuccessful Polish January Uprising.

In the late Middle Ages, Stężyca was spelled as Stanzitia (1325–1327), Stazicza (1365), Stanzicza (1441), and Sthezicza (1569). The early settlement was founded near a fortified gord, which guarded the Vistula river crossing. Its name probably comes from ancient Polish word "stężyć", which means "to strengthen". In the spring of 1575, after the escape of King Henry of Poland and France, the town was the seat of the so-called "Stężyca Sejm" from 12 May to 4 June 1575. The village has a Gothic church of St. Martin (1434).
