= Dębówka, Garwolin County =

Dębówka
- Village
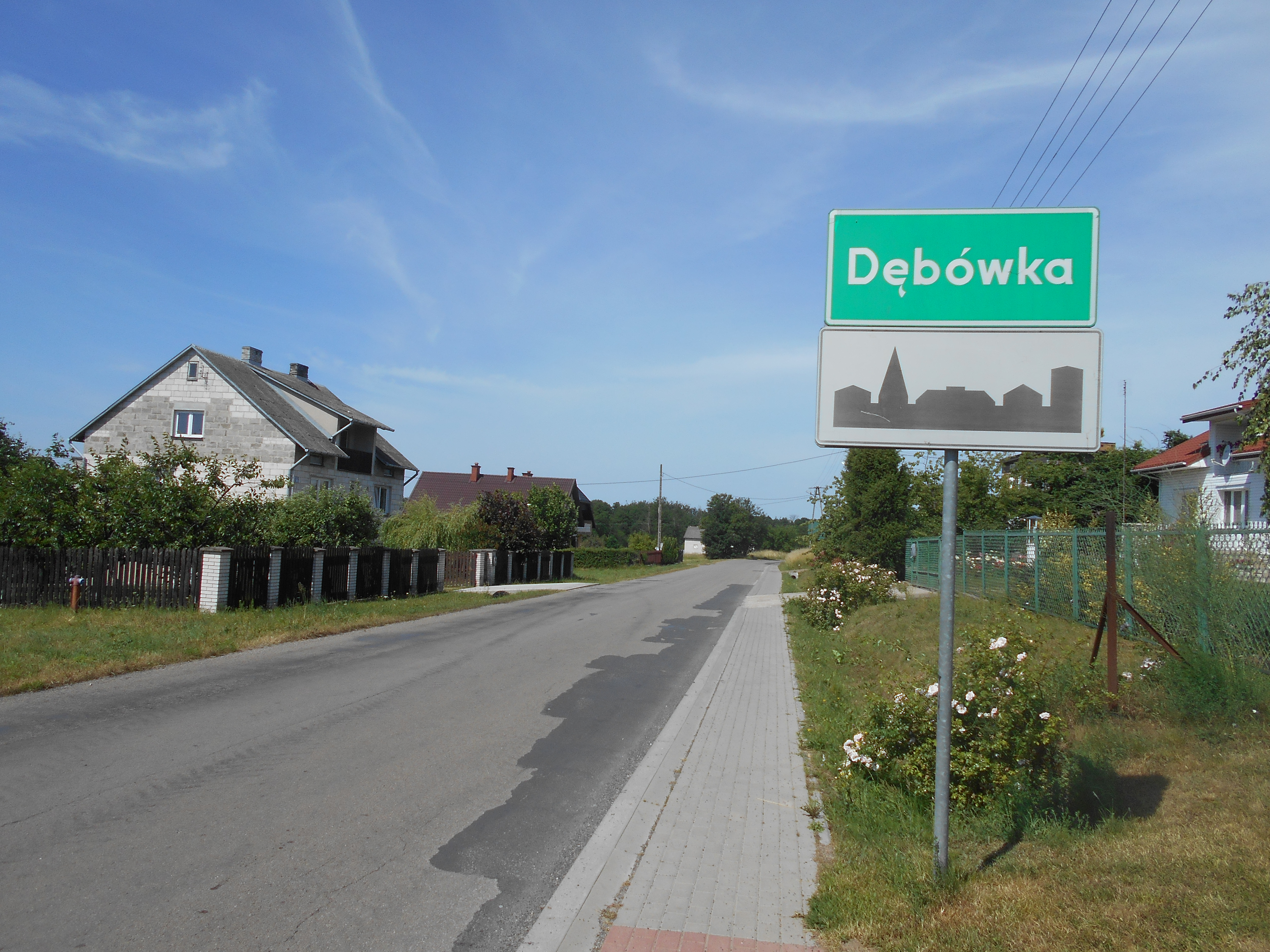

- Location within Poland
- Coordinates: 51°40′49″N 21°41′40″E
- Country: Poland
- Voivodeship: Masovian
- County: Garwolin
- Gmina: Trojanów

Dębówka [dɛmˈbufka] is a village in the administrative district of Gmina Trojanów, within Garwolin County, Masovian Voivodeship, in east-central Poland.
