= Dudki, Masovian Voivodeship =

Dudki
- Village
- Location within Poland
- Coordinates: 51°44′N 21°51′E
- Country: Poland
- Voivodeship: Masovian
- County: Garwolin
- Gmina: Trojanów

Dudki [ˈdutki] is a village in the administrative district of Gmina Trojanów, within Garwolin County, Masovian Voivodeship, in east-central Poland.
