= Majdan, Garwolin County =

Majdan
- Village
- Location within Poland
- Coordinates: 51°40′23″N 21°49′38″E
- Country: Poland
- Voivodeship: Masovian
- County: Garwolin
- Gmina: Trojanów

Majdan (Polish pronunciation: [ˈmajdan]) is a village in the administrative district of Gmina Trojanów, within Garwolin County, Masovian Voivodeship, in east-central Poland.
