= 2026 Italian rail sabotage =

February 2026 coordinated attacks on Italian railway infrastructure

- Date: February 7, 2026
- Location: Bologna and Pesaro, Italy
- Type: Sabotage, arson, domestic terrorism
- Motive: Opposition to the 2026 Winter Olympics
- Participants: Anarchist groups (claimed responsibility)

The 2026 Italian rail sabotage was a series of coordinated strikes against Italy's national railway infrastructure on February 7, 2026. The incidents occurred on the first full day of the 2026 Winter Olympics (Milano Cortina 2026) and primarily targeted the critical rail corridor near the Bologna hub. While no injuries were reported, the attacks caused extensive delays and service cancellations for approximately 40,000 passengers across Northern and Central Italy. On February 9, an anarchist group claimed responsibility for the acts via an online manifesto.

== Incidents ==
According to police reports, three distinct incidents occurred within a four-hour window on the morning of February 7:

Pesaro arson: Before dawn, an electrical cabin housing track-switching equipment was set on fire near Pesaro. The fire damaged signaling cables on the Ancona–Rimini line, paralyzing traffic along the Adriatic coast.

Bologna cable damage: Technicians at the Bologna hub discovered that fiber-optic cables used for train speed detection had been deliberately severed in manholes near Castel Maggiore.

IED discovery: A rudimentary incendiary device, consisting of a plastic bottle filled with flammable liquid and a timer, was neutralized by bomb disposal units on a track switch linking Bologna to Padua.

== Impact ==
The state-owned railway operator, Ferrovie dello Stato Italiane, reported that high-speed services were diverted to conventional surface lines, resulting in delays of up to 150 minutes. The disruptions impacted travelers heading to Olympic venues in Milan, Venice, and Cortina d'Ampezzo.

== Investigation and claims ==
The Italian Ministry of the Interior described the events as "serious sabotage" and "acts of terrorism" intended to damage Italy's international image during the Games. The investigation is being led by the DIGOS anti-terrorism unit.

On February 9, 2026, a statement was published on an anarchist web portal claiming responsibility. The group characterized the Olympics as a "capitalist showcase" and a "testing ground for mass surveillance," stating that the sabotage was a response to government security policies.

== See also ==
- 2024 France railway arson attacks
