= Brzeziny, Ryki County =

Brzeziny
- Village
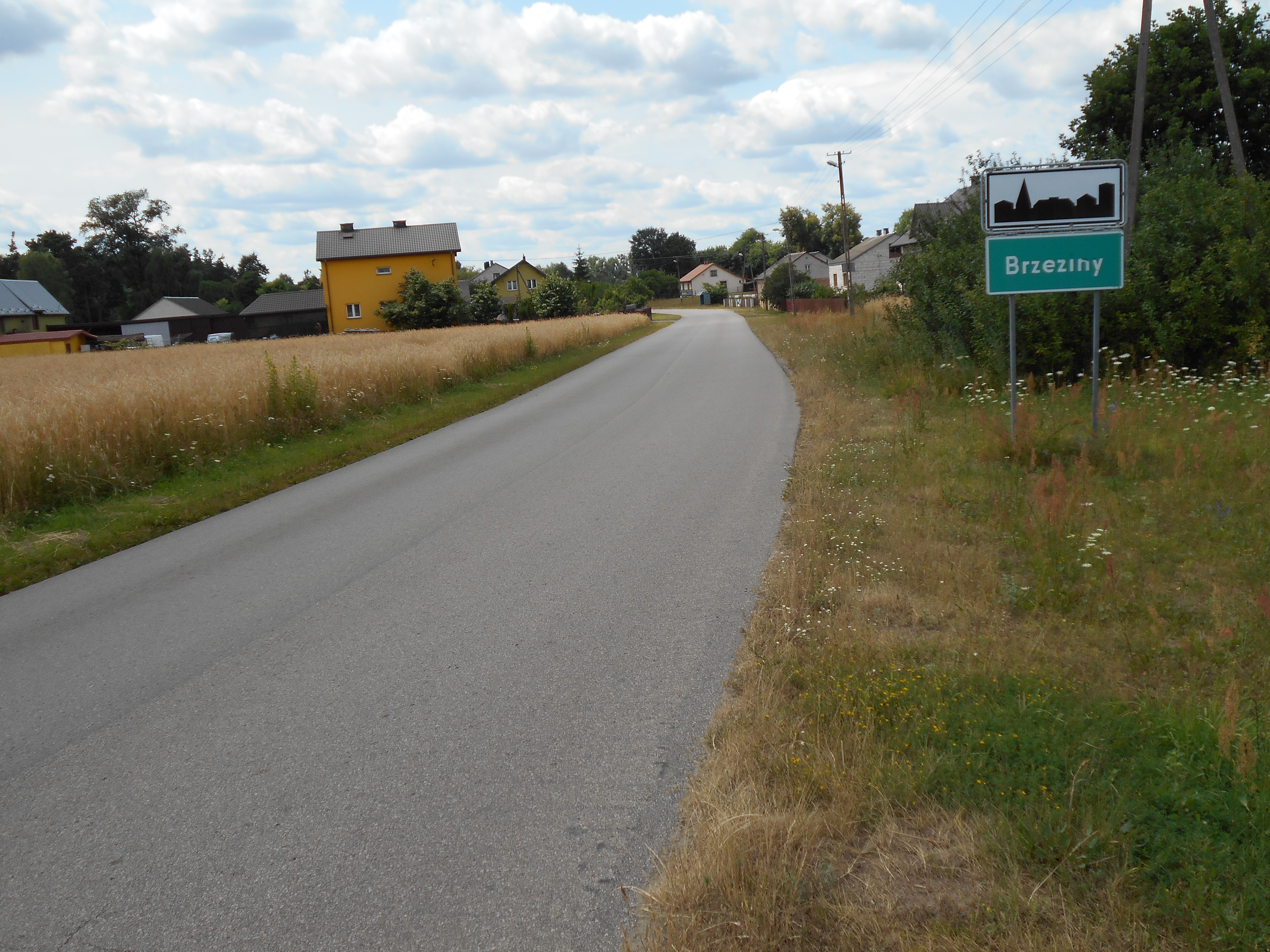

- Location within Poland
- Coordinates: 51°37′34″N 21°49′52″E
- Country: Poland
- Voivodeship: Lublin
- County: Ryki
- Gmina: Stężyca

Population
  - Total: 460
- Time zone: UTC+1 (CET)
  - Summer (DST): UTC+2 (CEST)

Brzeziny [bʐɛˈʑinɨ] is a village in the administrative district of Gmina Stężyca, within Ryki County, Lublin Voivodeship, in eastern Poland.

== History ==
Nine Polish citizens were murdered by Nazi Germany in the village during World War II.
