= Prandocin, Masovian Voivodeship =

Prandocin
- Village
- Location within Poland
- Coordinates: 51°42′N 21°43′E
- Country: Poland
- Voivodeship: Masovian
- County: Garwolin
- Gmina: Trojanów

Prandocin [pranˈdɔt͡ɕin] is a village in the administrative district of Gmina Trojanów, within Garwolin County, Masovian Voivodeship, in east-central Poland.
