= Długowola, Lublin Voivodeship =

Długowola
- Village
- Location within Poland
- Coordinates: 51°37′N 21°41′E
- Country: Poland
- Voivodeship: Lublin
- County: Ryki
- Gmina: Stężyca

Długowola [dwuɡɔˈvɔla] is a village in the administrative district of Gmina Stężyca, within Ryki County, Lublin Voivodeship, in eastern Poland.
