= Mroków, Garwolin County =

Mroków
- Village
- Location within Poland
- Coordinates: 51°45′N 21°48′E
- Country: Poland
- Voivodeship: Masovian
- County: Piaseczno
- Gmina: Trojanów

Mroków [ˈmrɔkuf] is a village in the administrative district of Gmina Trojanów, within Garwolin County, Masovian Voivodeship, in east-central Poland.
