= Mościska, Garwolin County =

Mościska
- Village
- Location within Poland
- Coordinates: 51°39′10″N 21°40′21″E
- Country: Poland
- Voivodeship: Masovian
- County: Garwolin
- Gmina: Trojanów

Mościska [mɔɕˈt͡ɕiska] is a village in the administrative district of Gmina Trojanów, within Garwolin County, Masovian Voivodeship, in east-central Poland.
