= Podebłocie =

- Village
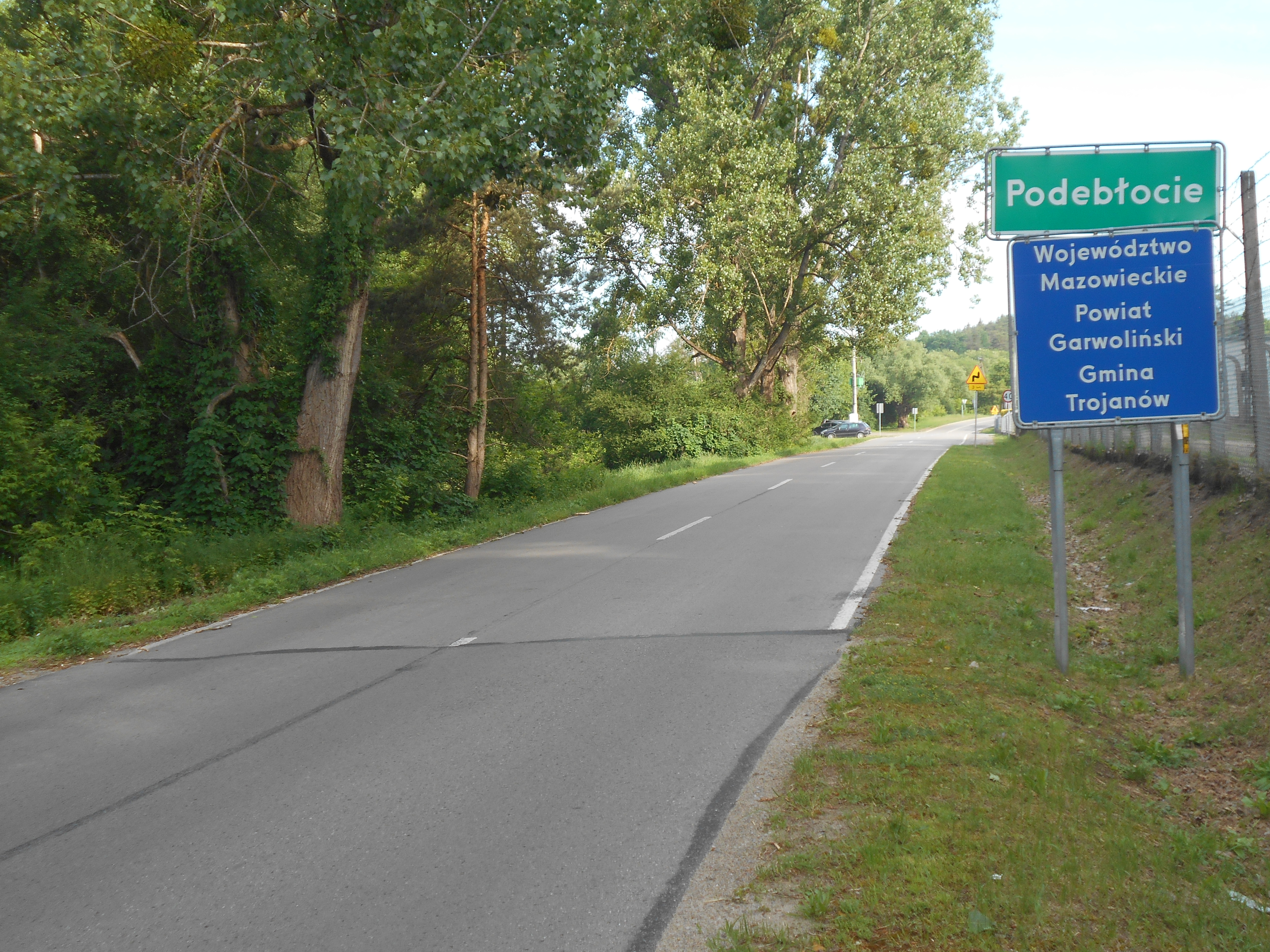

- Location within Poland
- Coordinates: 51°38′25″N 21°44′39″E
- Country: Poland
- Voivodeship: Masovian
- County: Garwolin
- Gmina: Trojanów
- Time zone: UTC+1 (CET)
  - Summer (DST): UTC+2 (CEST)
- Vehicle registration: WG

Podebłocie [pɔdɛˈbwɔt͡ɕɛ] is a village in the administrative district of Gmina Trojanów, within Garwolin County, Masovian Voivodeship, in east-central Poland.

== History ==
According to the 1921 census, the village with the adjacent manor farm and settlement had a population of 547, entirely Polish by nationality and 99.6% Catholic by confession.

Three Polish citizens were murdered by Nazi Germany in the village during World War II.
