= Stara Rokitnia =

- Village
- Location within Poland
- Coordinates: 51°38′N 21°49′E
- Country: Poland
- Voivodeship: Lublin
- County: Ryki
- Gmina: Stężyca
- Population (approx.): 500

Stara Rokitnia [ˈstara rɔˈkitɲa] is a village in the administrative district of Gmina Stężyca, within Ryki County, Lublin Voivodeship, in eastern Poland.
