= Życzyn =

- Village
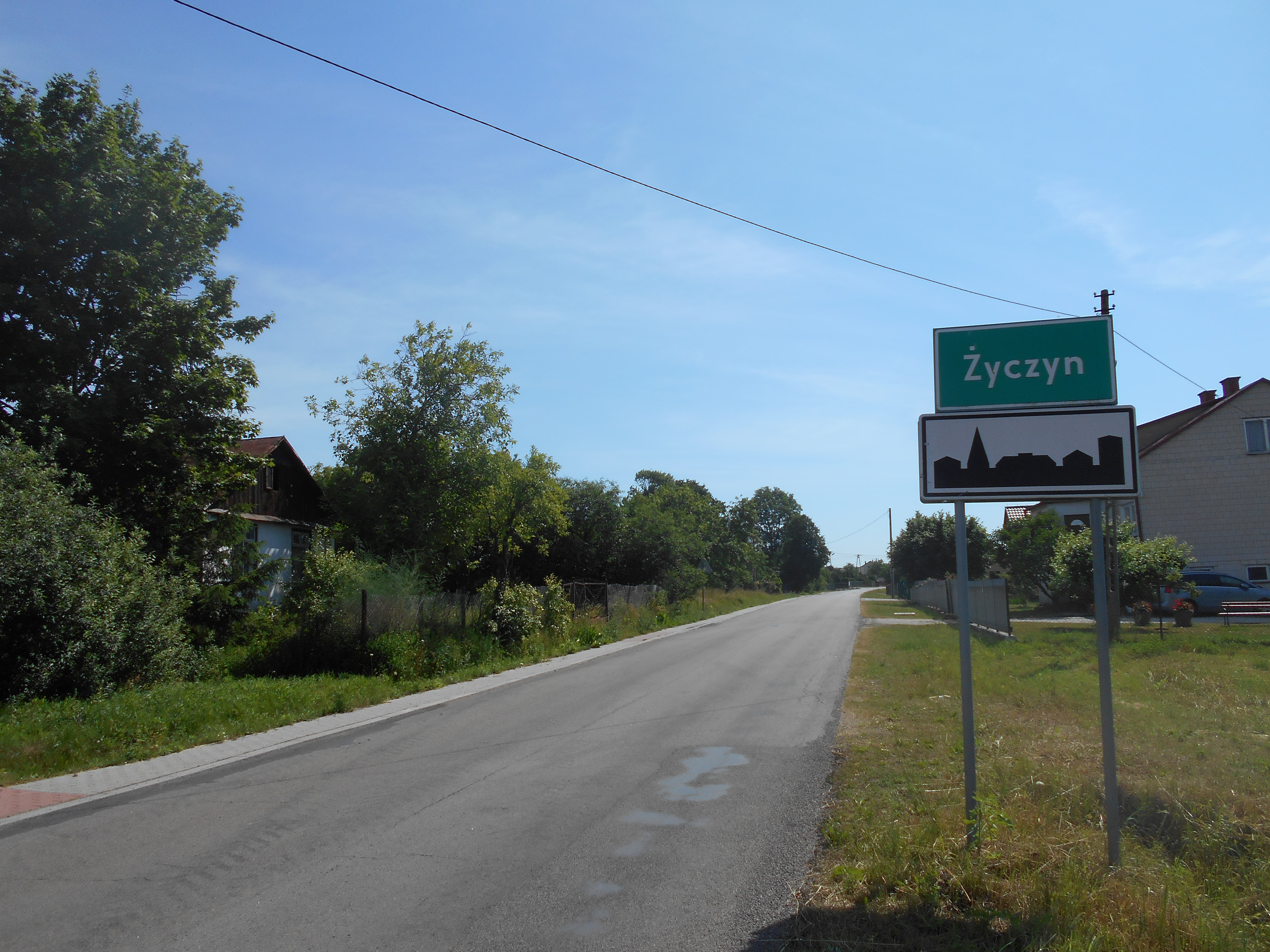

- Location within Poland
- Coordinates: 51°41′N 21°44′E
- Country: Poland
- Voivodeship: Masovian
- County: Garwolin
- Gmina: Trojanów
- Time zone: UTC+1 (CET)
  - Summer (DST): UTC+2 (CEST)
- Vehicle registration: WG

Życzyn [ˈʐɨt͡ʂɨn] is a village in the administrative district of Gmina Trojanów, within Garwolin County, Masovian Voivodeship, in east-central Poland.

== History ==
Historical population
Year	Pop.	±%
1664	115	—
1827	294	+155.7%
1921	386	+31.3%

Życzyn was a royal village of the Kingdom of Poland, administratively located in the Sandomierz Voivodeship in the Lesser Poland Province.

According to the 1921 census, the village had a population of 689, entirely Polish by nationality and 99.0% Catholic by confession.

21 Polish citizens were murdered by Nazi Germany in the village during World War II.

On 16 November 2025 the railway in the village was demolished by an act of sabotage, for which Poland blamed two Russian-linked Ukrainian nationals.
