= Piotrówek, Masovian Voivodeship =

Piotrówek
- Village
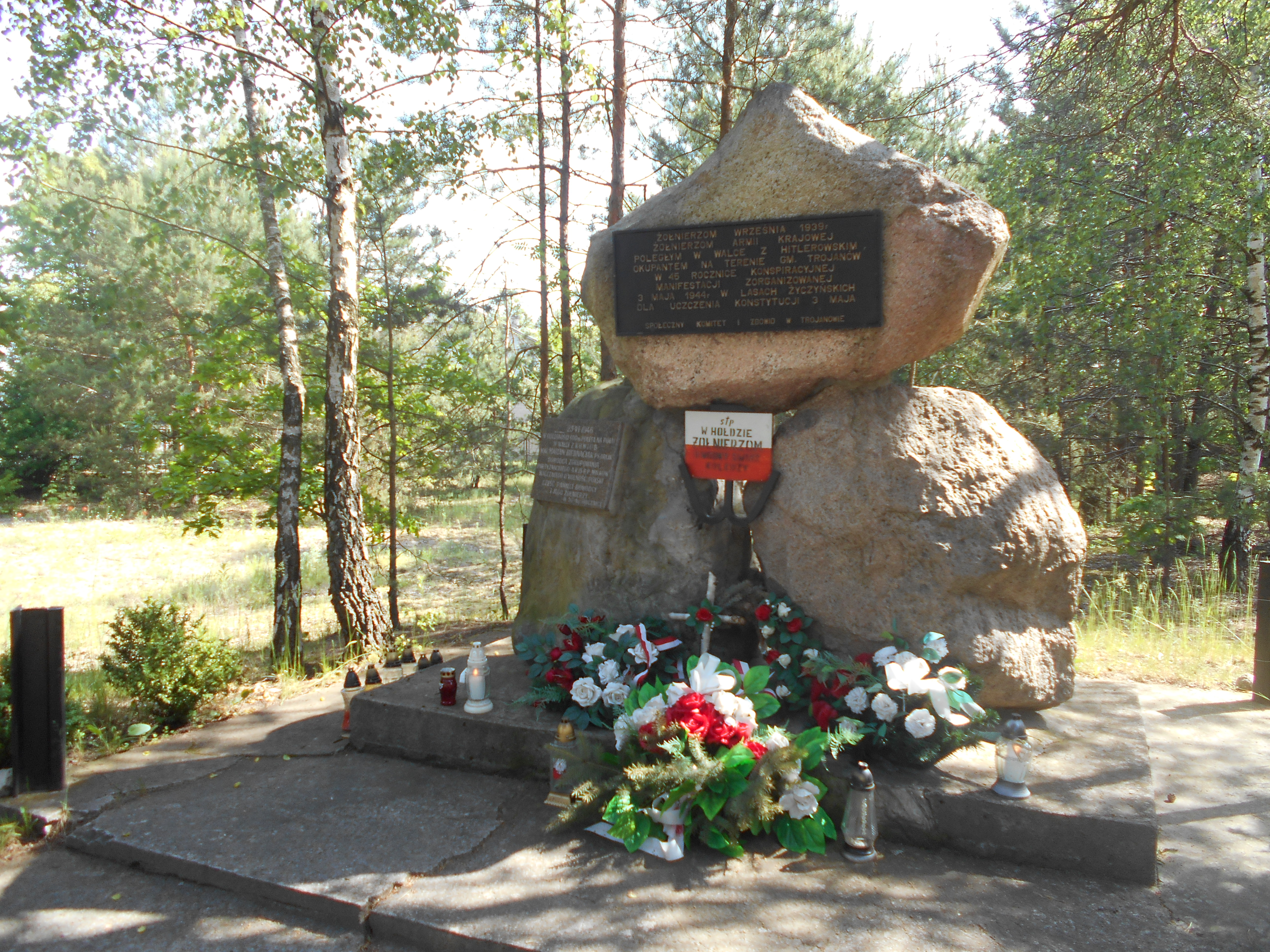

- Location within Poland
- Coordinates: 51°39′25″N 21°47′43″E
- Country: Poland
- Voivodeship: Masovian
- County: Garwolin
- Gmina: Trojanów

Piotrówek [pjɔˈtruvɛk] is a village in the administrative district of Gmina Trojanów, within Garwolin County, Masovian Voivodeship, in east-central Poland.
