= Kozice, Garwolin County =

Kozice
- Village
- Location within Poland
- Coordinates: 51°41′N 21°47′E
- Country: Poland
- Voivodeship: Masovian
- County: Garwolin
- Gmina: Trojanów

Kozice [kɔˈʑit͡sɛ] is a village in the administrative district of Gmina Trojanów, within Garwolin County, Masovian Voivodeship, in east-central Poland.
