= Brzeźce, Lublin Voivodeship =

Brzeźce
- Village
- Location within Poland
- Coordinates: 51°35′24″N 21°42′56″E
- Country: Poland
- Voivodeship: Lublin
- County: Ryki
- Gmina: Stężyca
- Population: 450

Brzeźce [ˈbʐɛɕt͡sɛ] is a village in the administrative district of Gmina Stężyca, within Ryki County, Lublin Voivodeship, in eastern Poland.
