= Gmina Trojanów =

Gmina Trojanów Trojanów Commune
- Gmina
- Coat of arms
- Interactive map of Gmina Trojanów
- Coordinates (Trojanów): 51°41′41″N 21°49′7″E
- Country: Poland
- Voivodeship: Masovian
- County: Garwolin
- Seat: Trojanów

Area
  - Total: 151.01 km^{2} (58.31 sq mi)

Population (2006)
  - Total: 7,757
  - Density: 51.37/km^{2} (133.0/sq mi)
- Website: https://www.trojanow.pl

Gmina Trojanów is a rural gmina (administrative district) in Garwolin County, Masovian Voivodeship, in east-central Poland. Its seat is the village of Trojanów, which lies approximately 27 kilometres (16 mi) south-east of Garwolin and 81 km (50 mi) south-east of Warsaw.

The gmina covers an area of 151.01 square kilometres (58.3 sq mi), and as of 2006 its total population is 7,757.

== Villages ==
Gmina Trojanów contains the villages and settlements of Babice, Budziska, Damianów, Dębówka, Derlatka, Dudki, Elżbietów, Jabłonowiec, Korytnica, Kozice, Kruszyna, Majdan, Mika, Mościska, Mroków, Ochodne, Piotrówek, Podebłocie, Prandocin, Ruda, Skruda, Trojanów, Więcków, Wola Korycka Dolna, Wola Korycka Górna, Wola Życka, Żabianka and Życzyn.

== Neighbouring gminas ==
Gmina Trojanów is bordered by the gminas of Kłoczew, Maciejowice, Ryki, Sobolew, Stężyca and Żelechów.
