= Mika, Masovian Voivodeship =

Mika
- Village
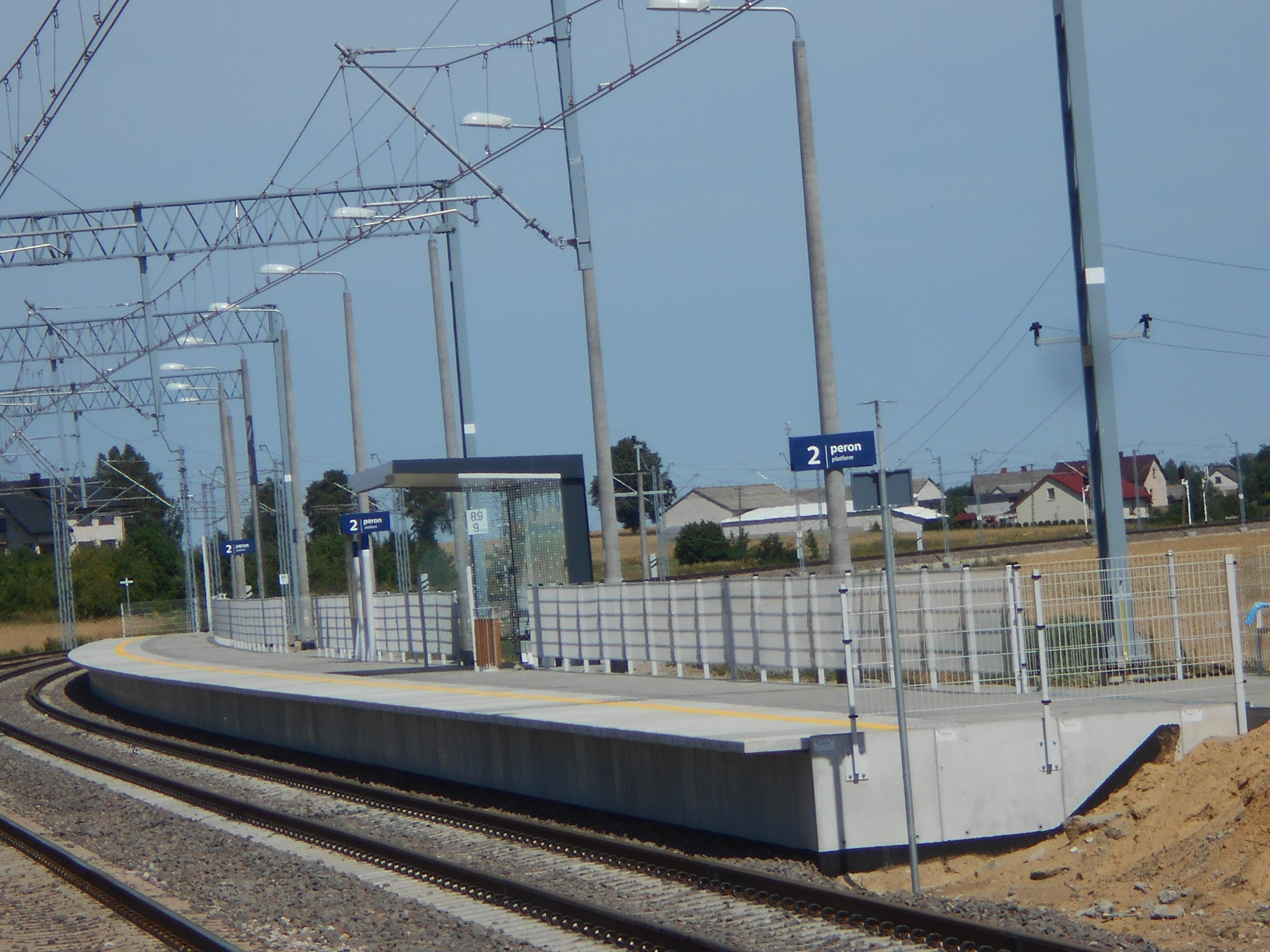
- Mika train stop

- Location within Poland
- Coordinates: 51°40′24″N 21°45′7″E
- Country: Poland
- Voivodeship: Masovian
- County: Garwolin
- Gmina: Trojanów
- Time zone: UTC+1 (CET)
  - Summer (DST): UTC+2 (CEST)
- Vehicle registration: WG

Mika [ˈmika] is a village in the administrative district of Gmina Trojanów, within Garwolin County, Masovian Voivodeship, in east-central Poland.

According to the 1921 census, the village with the adjacent settlement had a population of 45, entirely Polish by nationality and Catholic by confession.
