= Gmina Stężyca, Lublin Voivodeship =

Gmina Stężyca Stężyca Commune
- Gmina
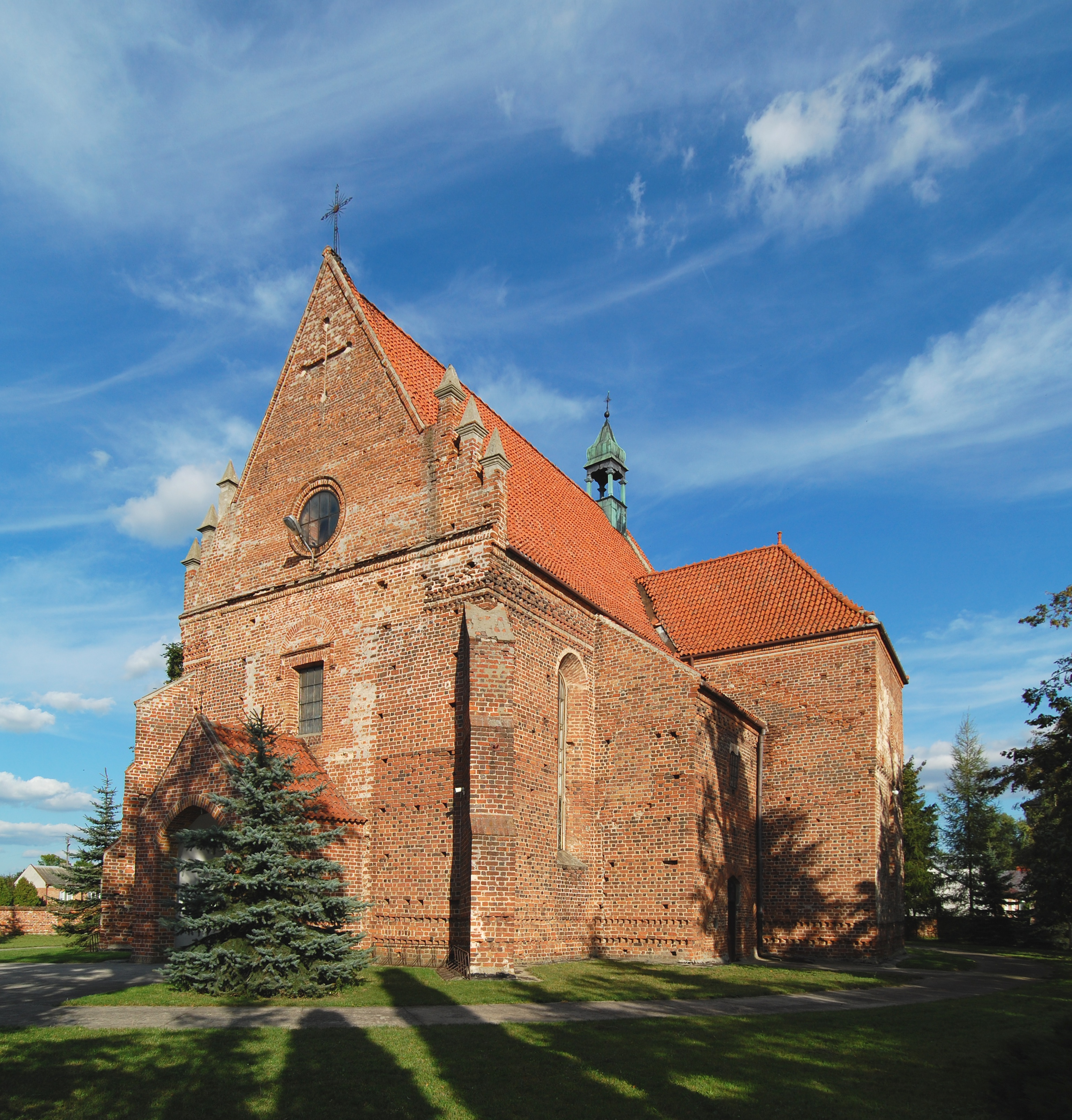
- St. Martin's Church in Stężyca

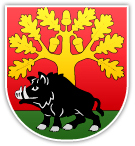
- Coat of arms

- Location within Poland
- Coordinates (Stężyca): 51°35′N 21°33′E
- Country: Poland
- Voivodeship: Lublin
- County: Ryki
- Seat: Stężyca

Area
  - Total: 116.78 km^{2} (45.09 sq mi)

Population (2006)
  - Total: 5,473
  - Density: 46.87/km^{2} (121.4/sq mi)
- Website: http://gmina-stezyca.webpark.pl

Gmina Stężyca is a rural gmina (administrative district) in Ryki County, Lublin Voivodeship, in eastern Poland. Its seat is the village of Stężyca, which lies approximately 28 kilometres (17 mi) west of Ryki and 81 km (50 mi) north-west of the regional capital Lublin.

The gmina covers an area of 116.78 square kilometres (45.1 sq mi), and as of 2006 its total population is 5,473.

== Villages ==
Gmina Stężyca contains the villages of Brzeźce, Brzeziny, Długowola, Drachalica, Kletnia, Krukówka, Nadwiślanka, Nowa Rokitnia, Paprotnia, Pawłowice, Piotrowice, Prażmów, Stara Rokitnia, Stężyca and Zielonka.

== Neighbouring gminas ==
Gmina Stężyca is bordered by the town of Dęblin and by the gminas of Kozienice, Maciejowice, Ryki, Sieciechów and Trojanów.
