= Stężyca Land =

Former administrative area in Poland

Coordinates: 51°43′21″N 21°57′36″E

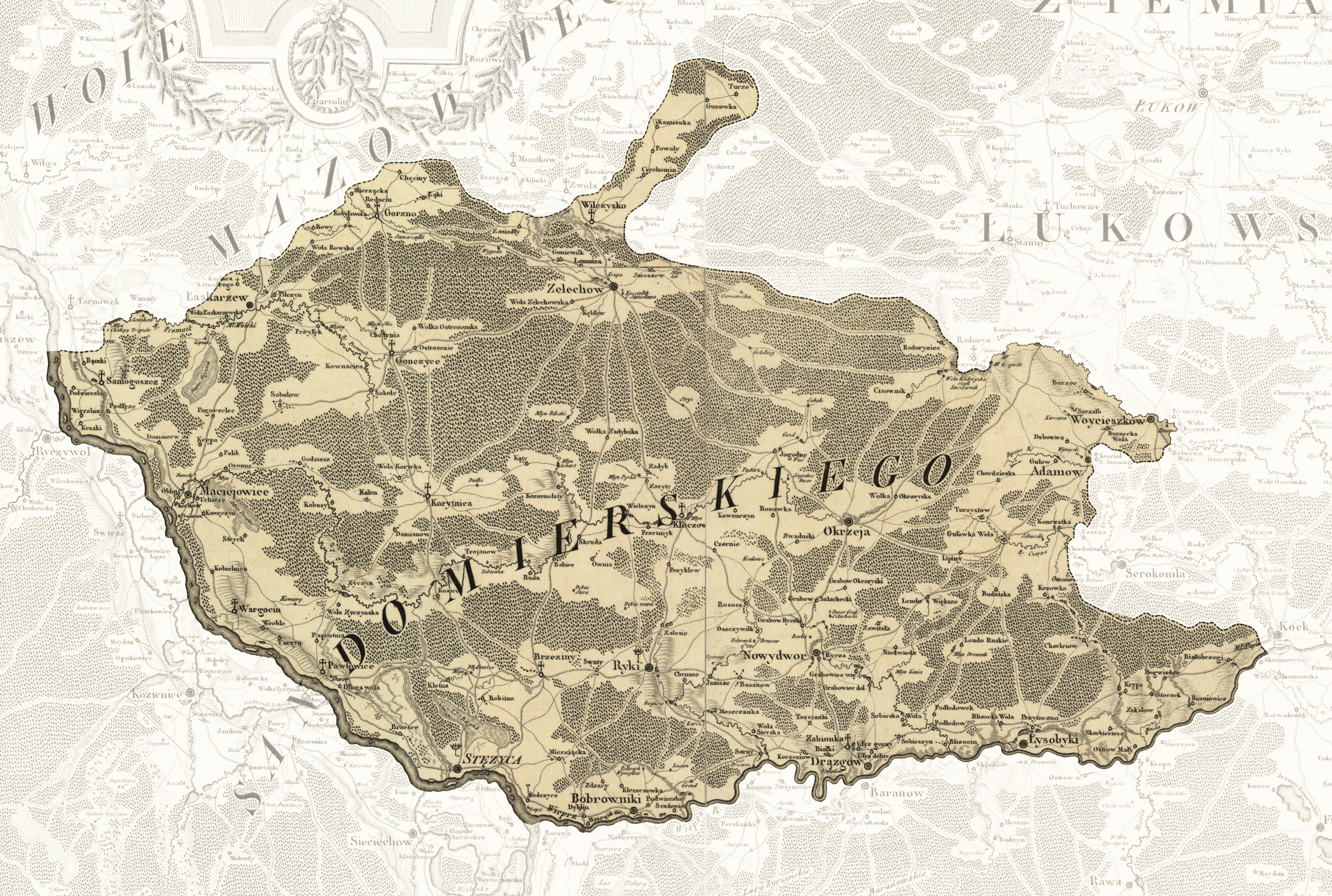
A highlighted excerpt from a map of Lublin Voivodeship showing the extent of Stężyca Land in 1792.

Stężyca Land (Polish: ziemia stężycka) was an administrative unit, the so called ziemia, of both the Kingdom of Poland and the Polish–Lithuanian Commonwealth. The land was composed of only one county, or powiat, and had its seat in the town of Stężyca after which it was named. Until the end of the 16th century, this area was called ziemia or powiat alternatively. From the beginning of the 17th century up to its dissolution, it was usually referred to, especially in official sources, as Stężyca Land. However, this did not mean that it had special political or administrative rights as could be the case with other ziemias. It was called a land because of its peripheral geographic location, being the only county in the northeastern corner of Sandomierz Voivodeship located east of the Vistula river. Today, the territory of former Stężyca Land covers all of Ryki County, the southern part of Garwolin County, and the southwestern corner of Łuków County. Its biggest urban center is Dęblin, which was granted town rights in 1954.

== History ==
From the time of the fragmentation of Poland until the Late Middle Ages, the area of the later Stężyca Land belonged to Sieciechów Castellany within the Duchy of Sandomierz. Due to the decline of Sieciechów as an urban centre caused by the changing course of the Vistula river, beginning in the 14th century its trade and administrative functions were gradually taken over by Stężyca. In 1397, the Stężyca County was created from the right-bank part of the Sieciechów Castellany. It was an area mostly covered with primeval forest, with a small number of settlements concentrated along the valleys of Vistula, Wieprz, and Okrzejka rivers.

During the reign of Władysław Jagiełło the county became a part of Radom Land. In the 15th century, the area underwent an increase in settlement, mainly from Mazovia and Radom Land. Its dense forests began to be cut down and replaced with arable land.As an administrative division of the Polish-Lithuanian Commonwealth, Stężyca Land was created in 1568. To the south and east, it bordered Lublin Voivodeship, in the north Mazovia’s Czersk Land, and in the west its border went along the Vistula river. Stężyca was the seat of the starosta and of the land court.

In the 17th century, the area of Stężyca Land was 1780 sq. kilometres, with nine towns: Stężyca, Żelechów, Łaskarzew, Bobrowniki, Okrzeja, Adamów, Łysobyki, Wojcieszków and Maciejowice. The land existed until 1793, when its territory was merged into Lublin Voivodeship.
