= Cisów, Świętokrzyskie Voivodeship =

Cisów
- Village
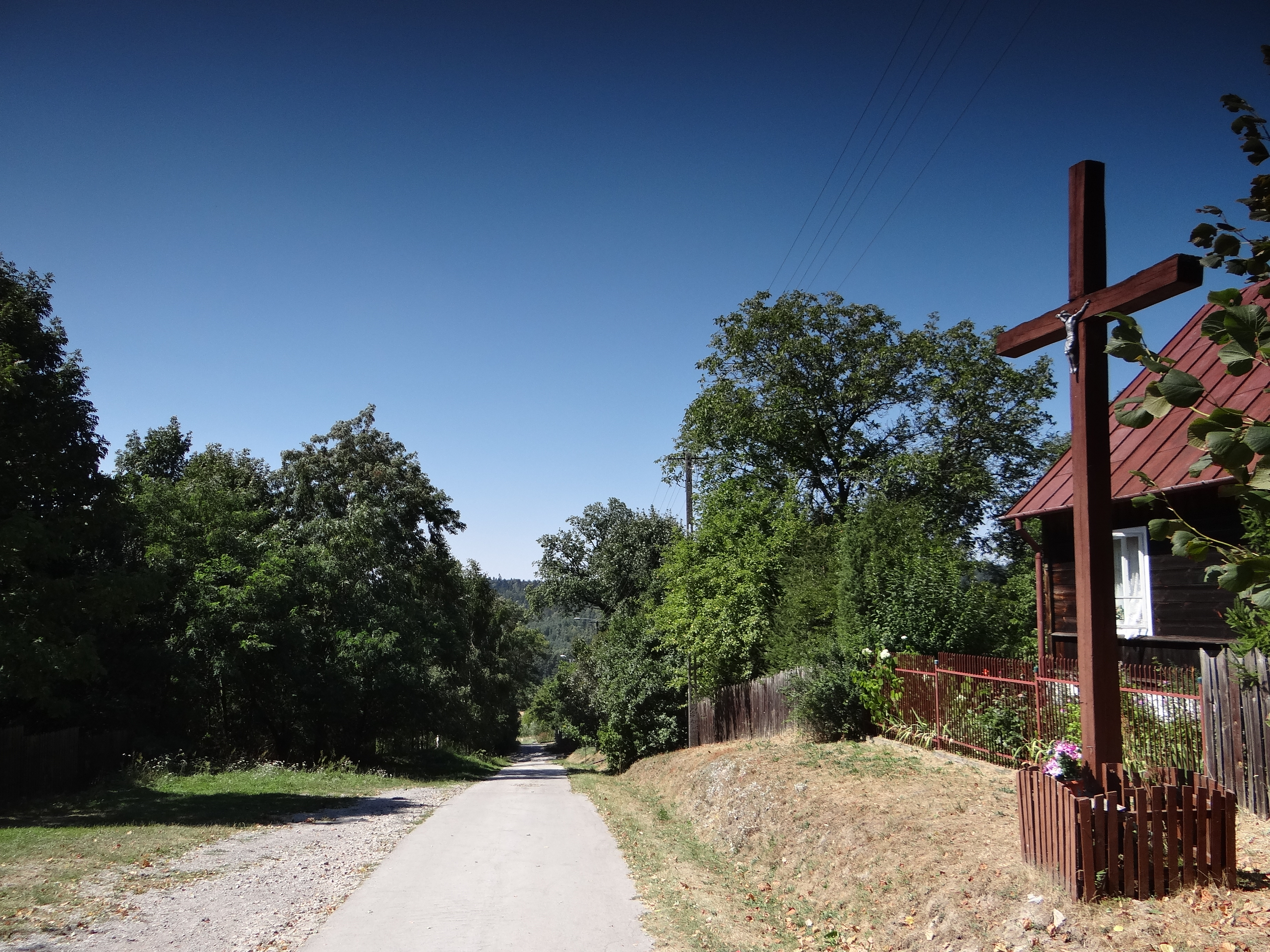

- Location within Poland
- Coordinates: 50°45′33″N 20°53′53″E
- Country: Poland
- Voivodeship: Świętokrzyskie
- County: Kielce
- Gmina: Daleszyce
- Highest elevation: 410 m (1,350 ft)
- Lowest elevation: 270 m (890 ft)
- Population: 1,232

Cisów [ˈt͡ɕisuf] is a village in the administrative district of Gmina Daleszyce, within Kielce County, Świętokrzyskie Voivodeship, in south-central Poland. It lies approximately 9 km (6 mi) south-east of Daleszyce and 25 km (16 mi) south-east of the regional capital Kielce.

== History ==
=== 15th century to 17th century ===
The first known mention of Cisów come from the first volume of Liber beneficiorum diocensis Cracoviensis by Jan Długosz, written ca. 1440. The village was then noted under the name Czyssów and its owner's name was Przedbór of Koniecpol, of the Pobóg coat of arms. It was also stated that there was a fortified residence (curiae unicum militare) within the boundaries of the village; associated with the ruins on top of nearby Zamczysko Hill.

In the second volume of Liber beneficiorum diocensis Cracoviensis, written between years 1470-1480, the owner of the village is noted to be Jan Oleski, of the Dębno coat of arms.

According to tax records from the years 1529 and 1579, the village was owned by the bishopric of Kraków as part of the Estate of Kielce.

In 1643, the Estate of Cisów was established which consisted of: Daleszyce, Cisów, Głazów, Drogowle, Korzenno, 7 mills (Biesak, Danek, Drogowelski, Łukawski, Moskal, Pod Korzennem, Słopiecki) and 3 colonies (Huta Szklana, Widełki, Wólka).

=== 18th century to 20th century ===
In 1701, the leaseholder of the village was Dębowski, a nephew of Jan Chryzostom Pasek.

In 1758, the bishop of Kraków, Andrzej Załuski, funded a creation of a new parish in Cisów. It was officially erected in 1765 and it encompassed the village itself, Łukawa and Wymysłów. The parish church's construction begun in 1770 and ended in 1816.

After the Third Partition of Poland in 1795, the village, with the rest of Chęciny County of Sandomierz Voivodeship, became a part of Habsburg monarchy. In years 1809-1815 the area belonged to the Duchy of Warsaw. Since 1815, it belonged to Congress Poland.

During the January Uprising, Cisów and its nearby forests were used as a hiding place by the insurgents, specifically by the groups commanded by Józef Hauke-Bosak, Apolinary Kurowski and Ludwik Zwierzdowski.

During the Second World War, the area was used for camping by the Home Army units commanded by Marian 'Barabasz' Sołtysiak.

== Sources ==
- Kalina, Dariusz (2023). Materiały do dziejów miasta i gminy Daleszyce, cz. 3 Wieś Cisów [Materials on the History of the Town and Municipality of Daleszyce, Part 3: The Village of Cisów] (in Polish). Daleszyce: Urząd Miasta i Gminy w Daleszycach. ISBN 978-83-969562-0-0.
