= Lucjan Kulej =

Polish ice hockey player, rower, and jurist

Aleksander Kowalski
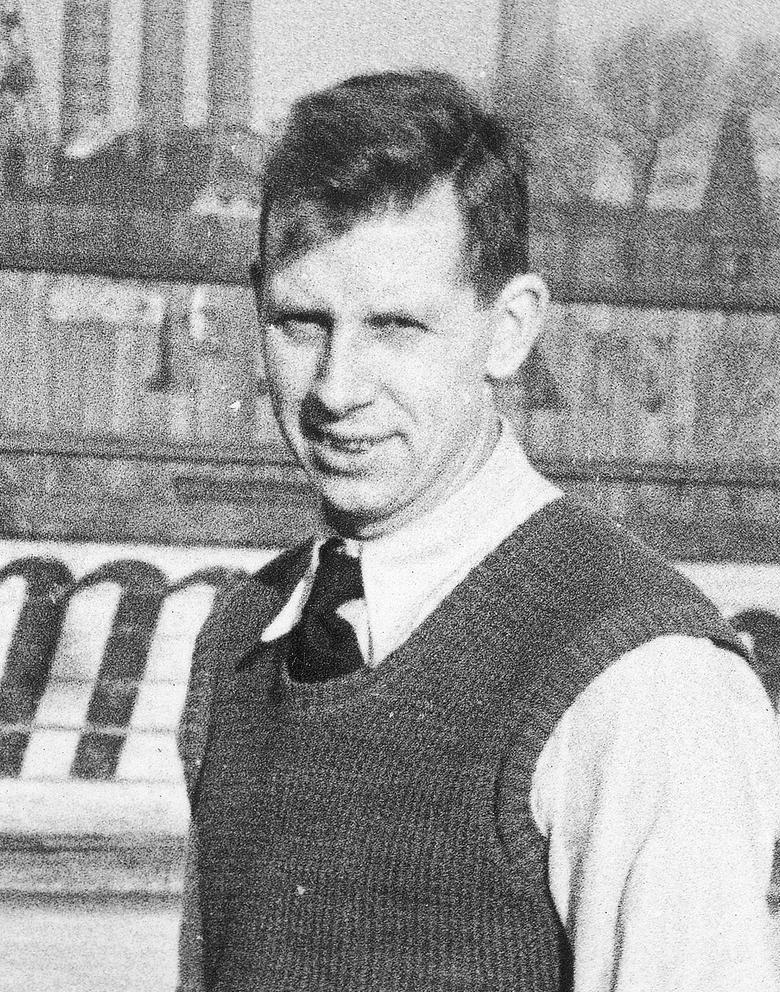
- Lucjan Kulej
- Born: 26 November 1896; Danków, Poland
- Died: 13 July 1971 (aged 74); Katowice, Poland
Ice hockey career
- Position: Defenceman
- Played for: AZS Warsaw (1924-1931); Polish national team (1925-1931); Polish Olympic team (1928)
- Coached for: Polish national team (1936)
- National team: Poland
- Military career
- Allegiance: Poland
- Branch: Army
- Unit: Bełt Battalion
- Conflicts: Warsaw Uprising (World War II)

Lucjan Kulej, nom de guerre Ostoja (November 26, 1896 in Danków – July 13, 1971 in Katowice) was a Polish jurist, rower, and ice hockey player who competed in the 1928 Winter Olympics. Kulej was among the athletes who spread and sustained the sport of ice hockey during the Polish-Soviet War; he and his brother also helped establish the hockey club in AZS Warsaw.

== Biography ==
Kulej studied law at the University of Warsaw, where he was part of the rowing team. In 1915, he joined the Polish Military Organization and was assigned to the Mounted Rifles Regiment in 1918. He became a prisoner of war in December 1918 after being injured in the field, but managed to escape in April 1919. He participated in a rowing competition held in 1920 to inspire Polish masses during a crucial deciding point of the war and was chosen to represent the country in the 1920 Summer Olympics, however he was called back to the front before he could compete.

Kulej played for the national team between 1925 and 1931, appearing in 29 matches and scoring two goals. In 1928, he participated with the Polish ice hockey team in the Olympic tournament. He co-founded the Silesian Ice Hockey Association and the Silesian Skating Society and later coached the Polish Olympic team alongside former AZS teammate Aleksander Tupalski in 1936.

Kulej was a prosecutor in district courts in Warsaw, Sosnowiec, Katowice, and Łomża in the 1930s. During World War II, he was a member of Armia Krajowa and was a judge in an underground court. He took part in the Warsaw Uprising as part of the Bełt Battalion under the name Ostoja. Though wounded, he managed to escape to Warsaw with his wife and lived under the name Wiśniewski. After the war, he opened a private practice.
