= Sieraków (disambiguation) =

Sieraków is a town in Greater Poland Voivodeship (west-central Poland).

Sieraków may also refer to:

- Sieraków, Lesser Poland Voivodeship (south Poland)
- Sieraków, Łódź Voivodeship (central Poland)
- Sieraków, Świętokrzyskie Voivodeship (south-central Poland)
- Sieraków, Subcarpathian Voivodeship (south-east Poland)
- Sieraków, Gostynin County in Masovian Voivodeship (central Poland)
- Sieraków, Warsaw West County in Masovian Voivodeship (east-central Poland)
- Sieraków, Wołomin County in Masovian Voivodeship (east-central Poland)
- Sieraków, Silesian Voivodeship (south Poland)
- Sieraków, Lubusz Voivodeship (west Poland)

== See also ==
- Sierakowo (disambiguation)
- Sierakowski
