= Borków =

Borków may refer to the following places in Poland:

- Borków, Lower Silesian Voivodeship (south-west Poland)
- Borków, Lublin Voivodeship (east Poland)
- Borków, Kielce County in Świętokrzyskie Voivodeship (south-central Poland)
- Borków, Opatów County in Świętokrzyskie Voivodeship (south-central Poland)
- Borków, Pińczów County in Świętokrzyskie Voivodeship (south-central Poland)
- Borków, Otwock County in Masovian Voivodeship (east-central Poland)
- Borków, Warsaw, a neighbourhood in Warsaw, Masovian Voivodeship (east-central Poland)
