= Niestachów =

- Village
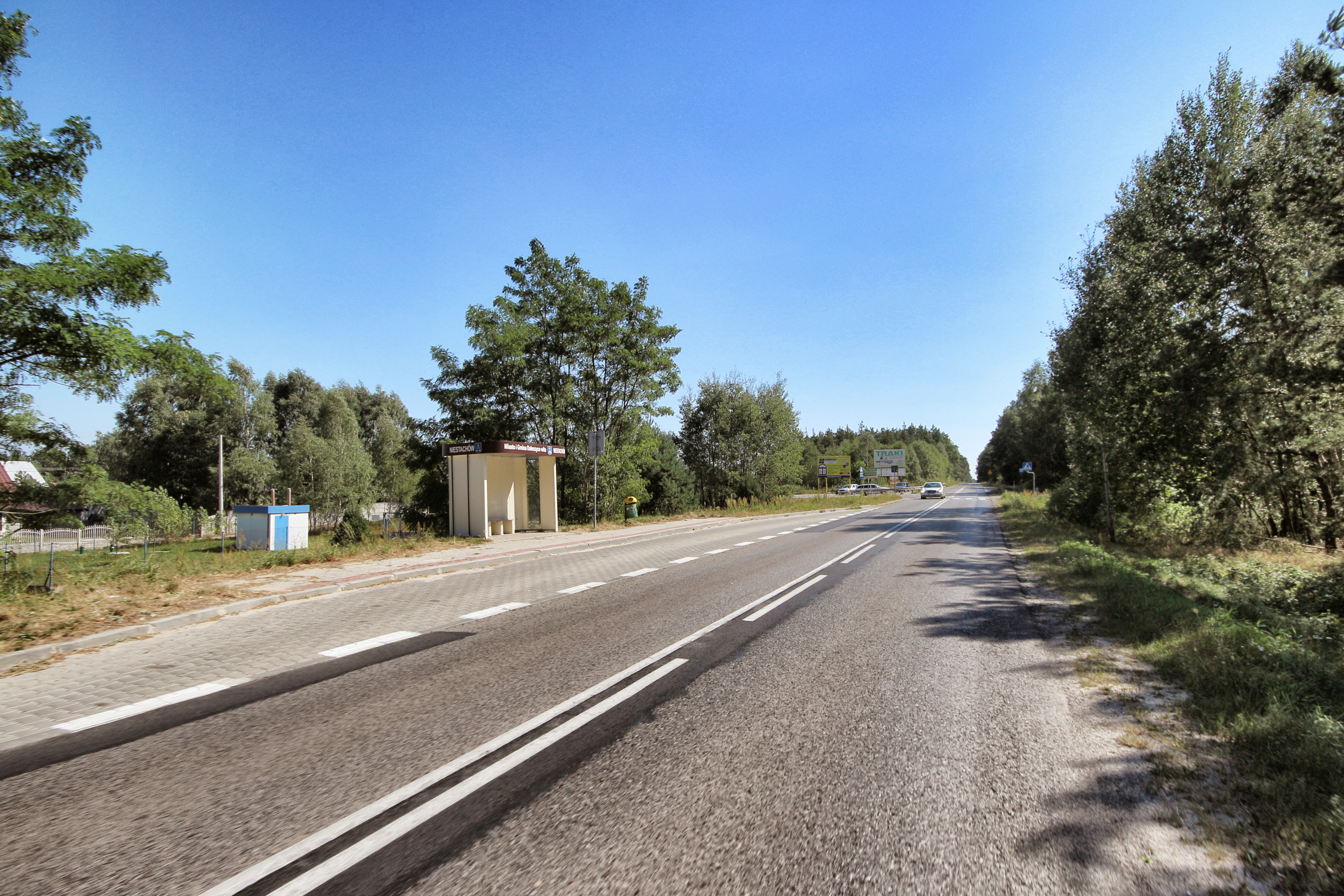

- Location within Poland
- Coordinates: 50°50′15″N 20°44′57″E
- Country: Poland
- Voivodeship: Świętokrzyskie
- County: Kielce
- Gmina: Daleszyce
- Population: 800

Niestachów [ɲɛsˈtaxuf] is a village in the administrative district of Gmina Daleszyce, within Kielce County, Świętokrzyskie Voivodeship, in south-central Poland. It lies approximately 6 km (4 mi) north-west of Daleszyce and 11 km (7 mi) south-east of the regional capital Kielce.
