= Słopiec =

- Village
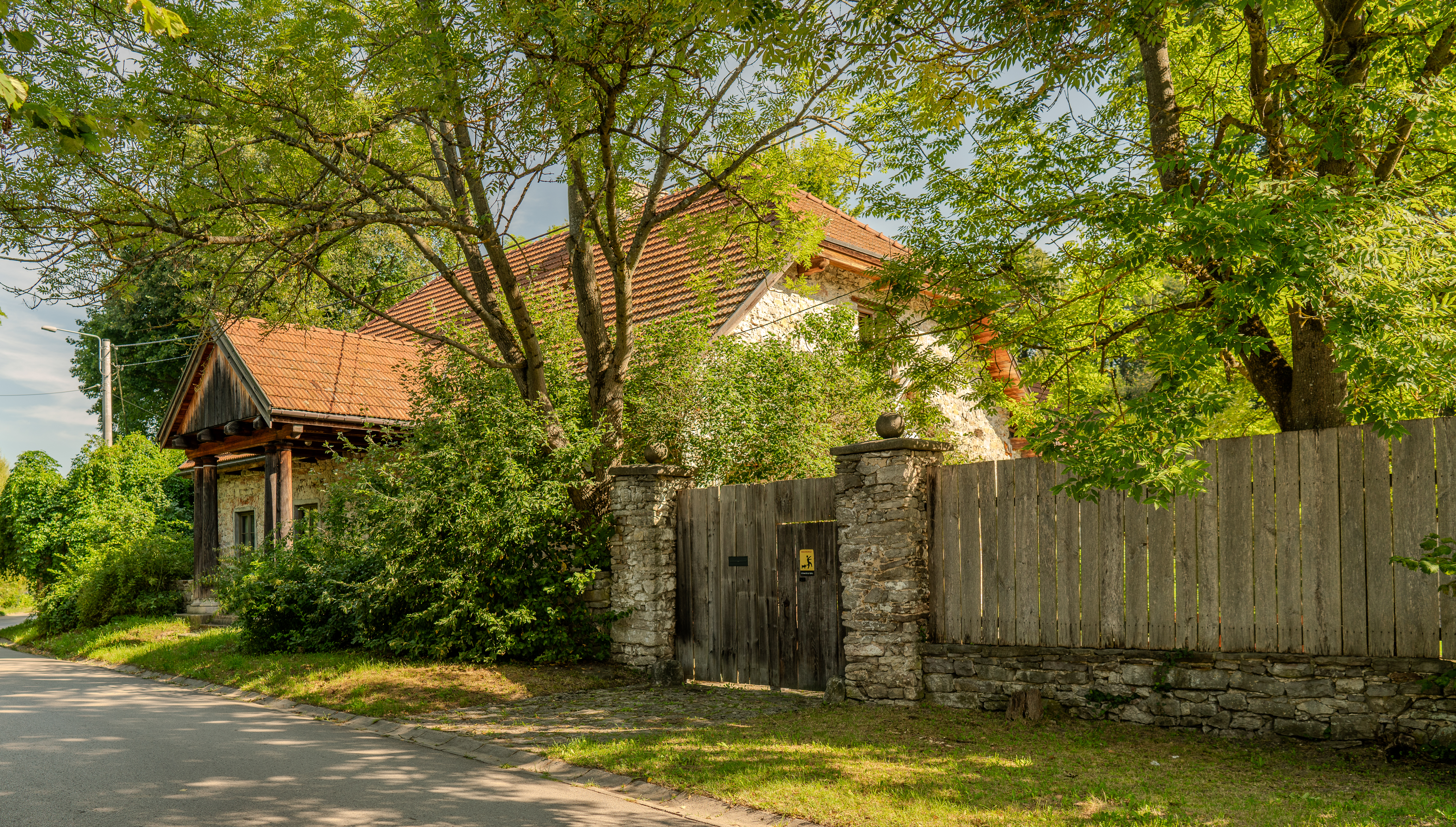
- Manor

- Location within Poland
- Coordinates: 50°46′28″N 20°47′2″E
- Country: Poland
- Voivodeship: Świętokrzyskie
- County: Kielce
- Gmina: Daleszyce
- Population (approx.): 800

Słopiec [ˈswɔpjɛt͡s] is a village in the administrative district of Gmina Daleszyce, within Kielce County, Świętokrzyskie Voivodeship, in south-central Poland. It lies approximately 4 km (2 mi) south-west of Daleszyce and 17 km (11 mi) south-east of the regional capital Kielce.
