= Suków, Świętokrzyskie Voivodeship =

Suków
- Village
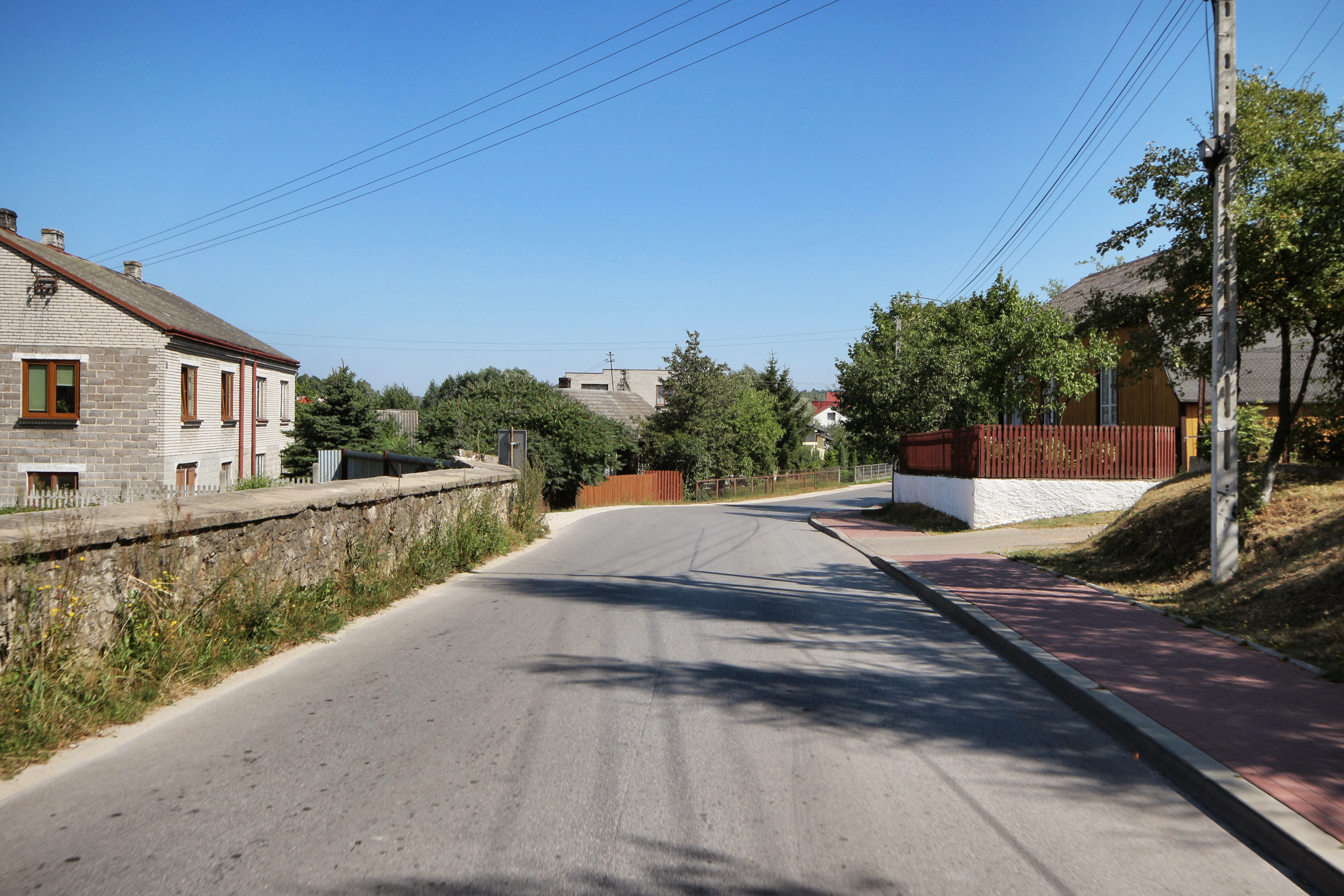

- Location within Poland
- Coordinates: 50°48′19″N 20°41′11″E
- Country: Poland
- Voivodeship: Świętokrzyskie
- County: Kielce
- Gmina: Daleszyce
- Population: 1,800

Suków [ˈsukuf] is a village in the administrative district of Gmina Daleszyce, within Kielce County, Świętokrzyskie Voivodeship, in south-central Poland. It is approximately 9 km (6 mi) west of Daleszyce and 10 km (6 mi) southeast of the regional capital Kielce.

The village has 1803 persons.
