= Smyków, Gmina Daleszyce =

Smyków
- Village
- Location within Poland
- Coordinates: 50°48′43″N 20°52′39″E
- Country: Poland
- Voivodeship: Świętokrzyskie
- County: Kielce
- Gmina: Daleszyce
- Population: 410

Smyków [ˈsmɨkuf] is a village in the administrative district of Gmina Daleszyce, within Kielce County, Świętokrzyskie Voivodeship, in south-central Poland. It lies approximately 6 km (4 mi) east of Daleszyce and 20 km (12 mi) south-east of the regional capital Kielce.
