= Pilzno (disambiguation) =

Pilzno is a town in Dębica County, Subcarpathian Voivodeship, Poland.

Pilzno may also refer to:

- Pilzno (Hasidic dynasty), a branch of Orthodox Judaism
- Gmina Pilzno
- Pilzno County

== See also ==
- Plzeň
