= Kranów =

- Village
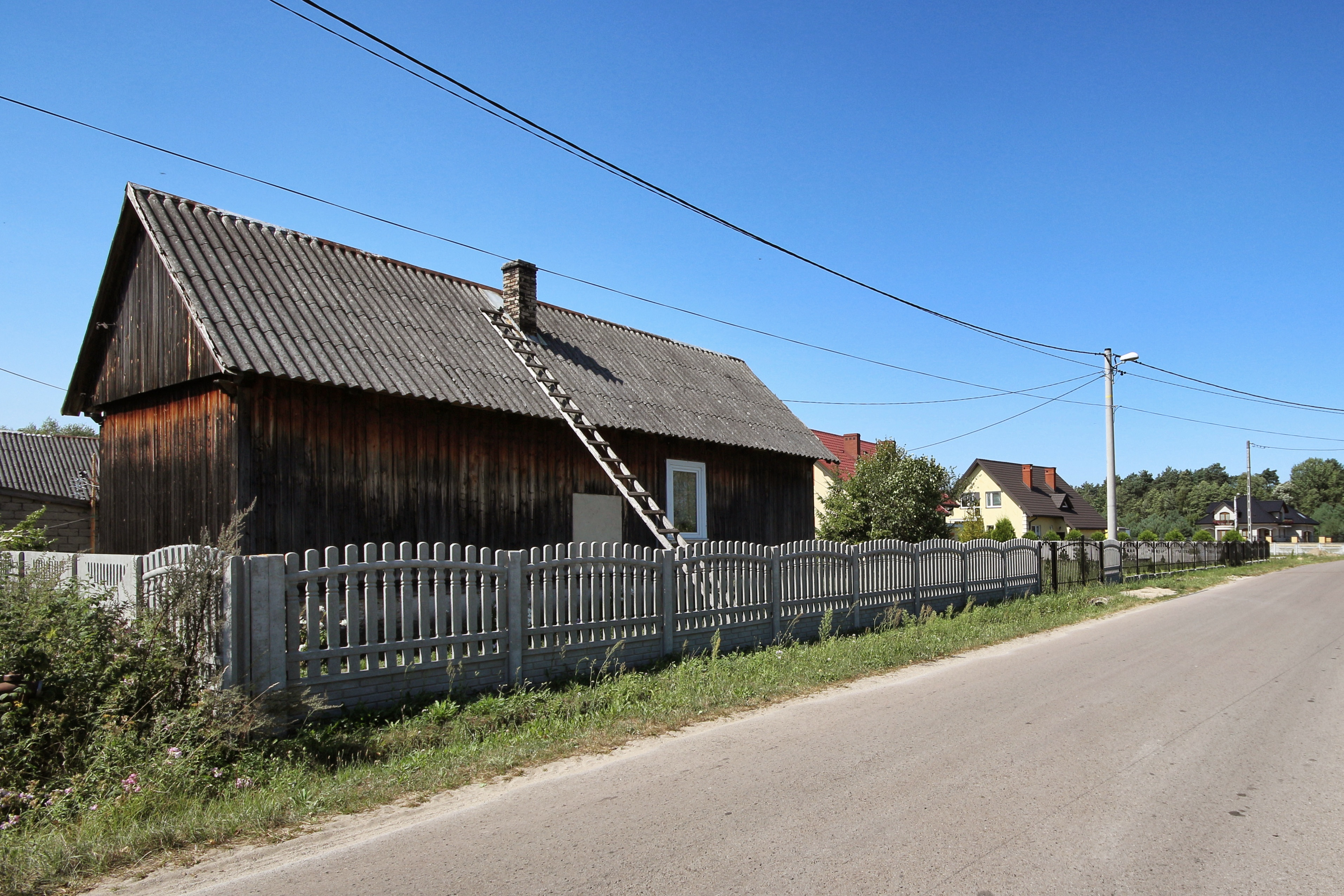

- Location within Poland
- Coordinates: 50°48′37″N 20°46′28″E
- Country: Poland
- Voivodeship: Świętokrzyskie
- County: Kielce
- Gmina: Daleszyce
- Population: 380

Kranów [ˈkranuf] is a village in the administrative district of Gmina Daleszyce, within Kielce County, Świętokrzyskie Voivodeship, in south-central Poland. It lies approximately 3 km (2 mi) west of Daleszyce and 14 km (9 mi) south-east of the regional capital Kielce.
