= Mójcza =

- Village
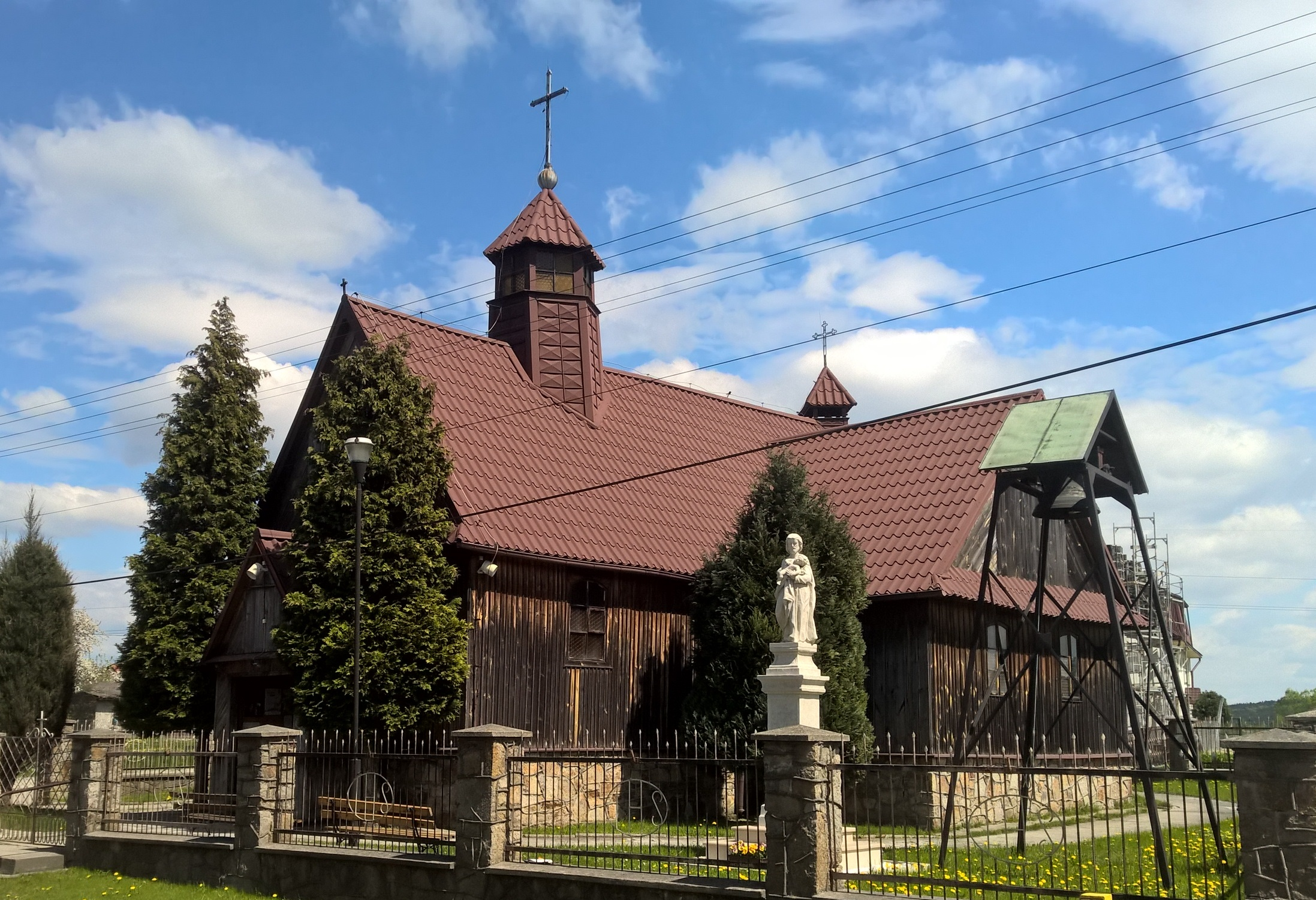
- Catholic church

- Location within Poland
- Coordinates: 50°50′31″N 20°40′55″E
- Country: Poland
- Voivodeship: Świętokrzyskie
- County: Kielce
- Gmina: Daleszyce
- Population: 1,100

Mójcza [ˈmui̯t͡ʂa] is a village in the administrative district of Gmina Daleszyce, within Kielce County, Świętokrzyskie Voivodeship, in south-central Poland. It lies approximately 10 km (6 mi) north-west of Daleszyce and 7 km (4 mi) south-east of the regional capital Kielce.
