= Trzemosna =

- Village
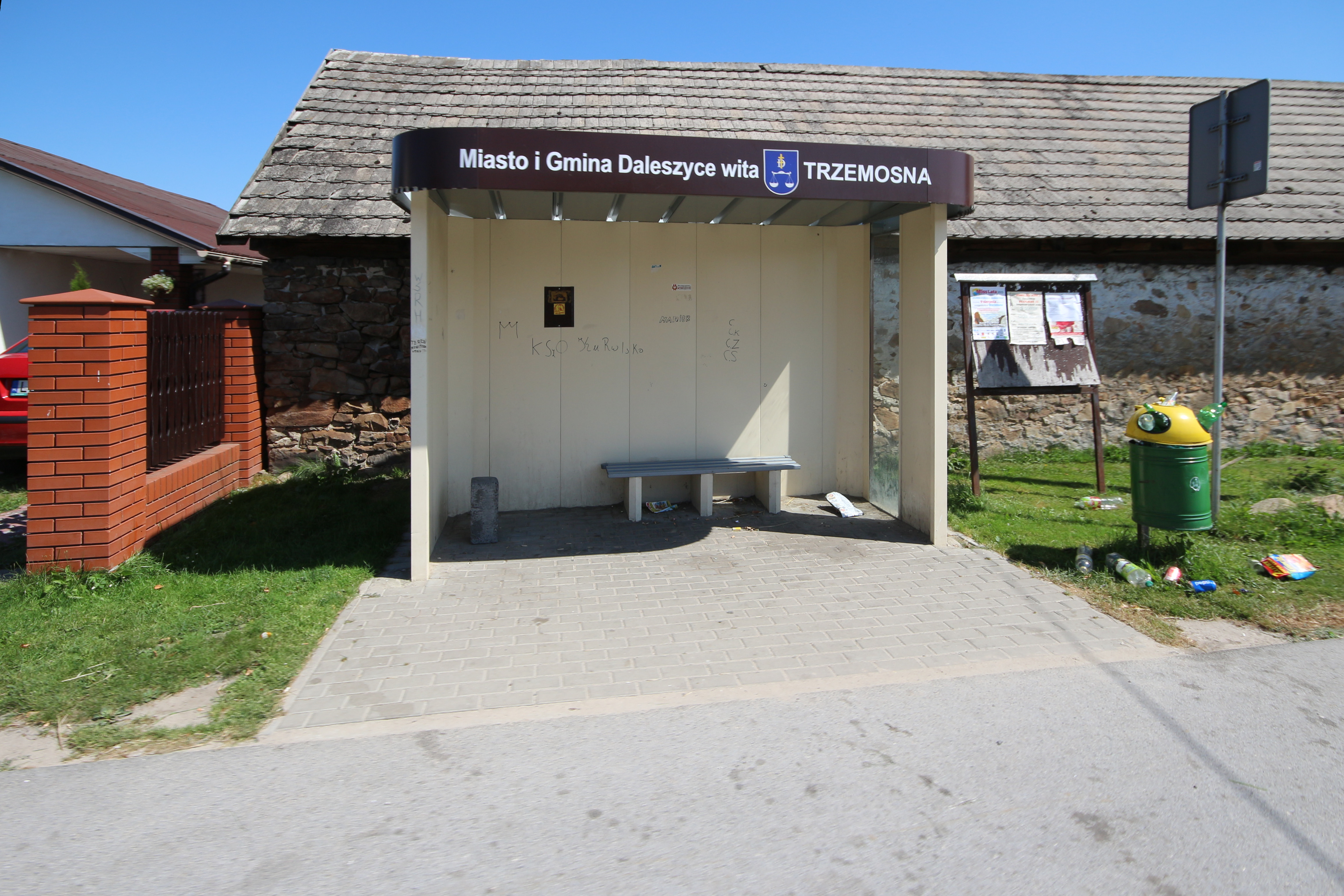
- Bus stop

- Location within Poland
- Coordinates: 50°44′56″N 20°47′33″E
- Country: Poland
- Voivodeship: Świętokrzyskie
- County: Kielce
- Gmina: Daleszyce
- Population: 250

Trzemosna [tʂɛˈmɔsna] is a village in the administrative district of Gmina Daleszyce, within Kielce County, Świętokrzyskie Voivodeship, in south-central Poland. It lies approximately 7 km (4 mi) south of Daleszyce and 20 km (12 mi) south-east of the regional capital Kielce.
