= Barricade on Jerusalem Avenue, Warsaw =

Coordinates: 52.2305°N 21.0149°E

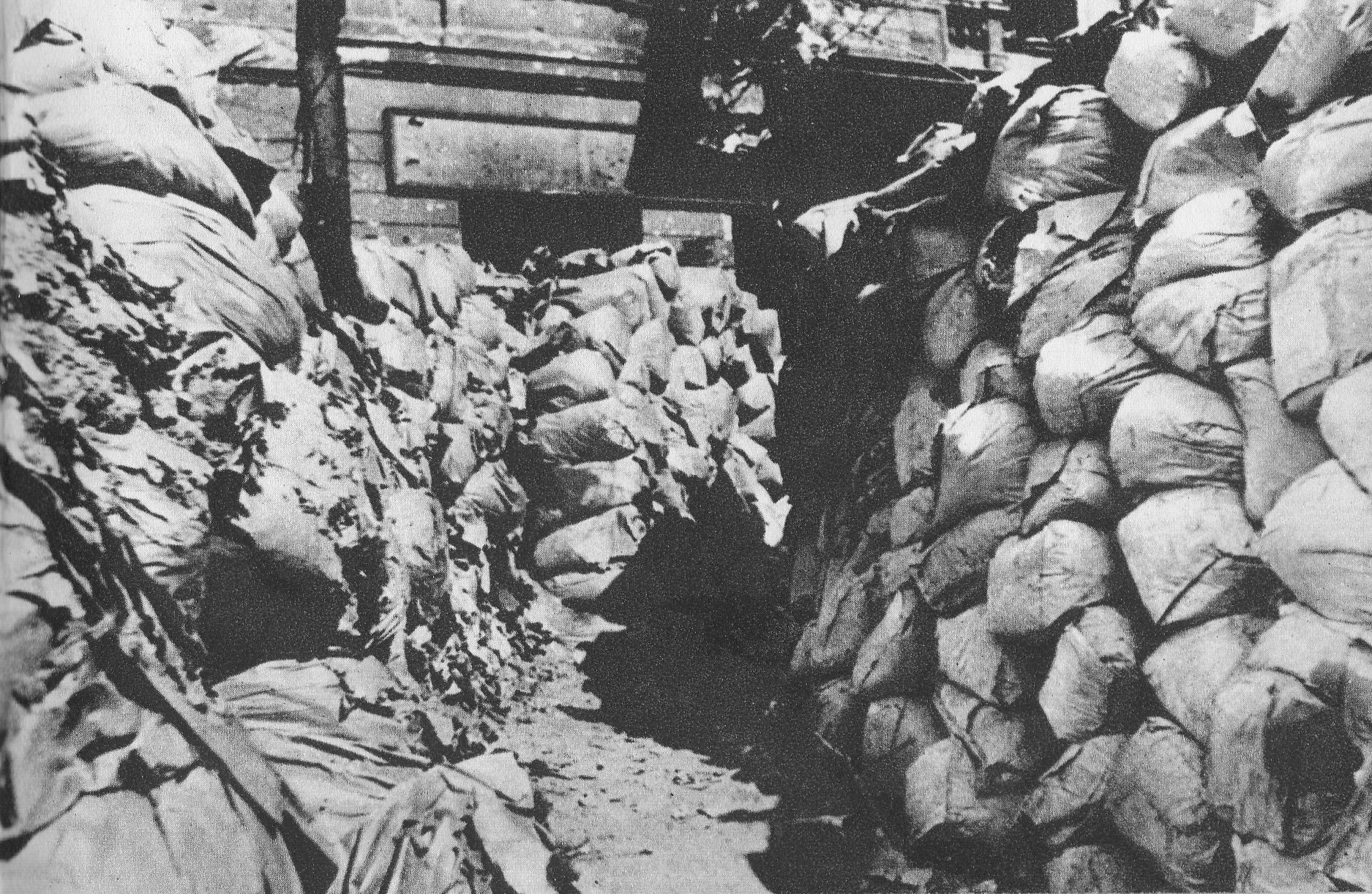
The barricade on Jerusalem Avenue in 1944

The barricade on Jerusalem Avenue was a defense structure built and manned by soldiers of the Bełt and Kilinski Battalions of the Home Army to protect a narrow passage between North Downtown to South Downtown during the Warsaw Uprising in 1944. It was located between 23 (then 17) and 27 Jerusalem Avenue in Warsaw.

== Origin ==
After the Tehran Conference, where it was decided that German-occupied territories of Poland would be liberated by the Soviet Army, command of the Polish Armed Forces in the West formed a strategy to defend its borders based on the largest insurgent army in Europe – the Home Army. The strategy made its mark in history as Operation Tempest. Home Army soldiers were to attack German forces in large cities and welcome Soviet soldiers as guests on their soil. The Operation was successful in a number of cities, however, the Soviets immediately began to neutralize any sort of Polish resistance. The greatest challenge of the entire operation was an uprising in the Polish capital– Warsaw. In late July 1944, an operational plan of liberating the capital was created. The key elements consisted of capturing and defending main transport routes connecting western districts of Warsaw with the Praga district such as Wolska street, Leszno street, and Jerusalem Avenue. The Germans priority was to maintain a steady connection with the eastern bank of Vistula river, where Soviet troops were advancing. The Home Army, however, had to hold a connection between Srodmiescie Polnocne (Northern Downtown) and Srodmiescie Poludniowe (Southern Downtown). The “Bolt” Battalion led by Lieutenant Erwin Brenneisen was tasked with operating in that area.

== Order de Bataille ==
The battalion's area of operation covered the odd side of Jerozolimskie Avenue, Marszalkowska Street, Three Crosses Square, Bracka Street and Nowy Swiat Street. The most important task of the battalion was to enable the Germans from marching through Jerusalem Avenue. Additionally, the battalion was ordered to build and protect a communication ditch which was to connect southern and northern parts of Srodmiescie. This ditch-barricade was intended to be built under heavy enemy fire from both sides of the avenue. The insurgents expected tanks, assault cannons, “Goliaths”, mortars and machine guns to be used by the Germans. The construction itself was conducted by “Bylinski Stanislaw” and “Andrzej” – Andrzej Lebdowicz. Their task was difficult – tramway tracks and an underground railroad stood in their way.

== The beginning of the uprising ==
At the “W” Hour, the “Bolt” Battalion of 180 men was stationed on Sniadeckich Street in Southern Downtown (Srodmiescie Poludniowe). In the late evening Brenneisen received an order to move to the south of Jerusalem Avenue to the area of Marszalkowska and Bracka Street. They were tasked with closing German west-east communications. The battalion was aided by the “Wik” Company commanded by Lieutenant Zenon Wiktorczyk and now had a manpower of around 350 people with little gain in firepower. The defense of the communication ditch was based on the barricade built between Krucza St. and Marszalkowska St. Civilians from nearby townhouses actively helped in the barricades construction. The task of breaking ground with pickaxes between houses No. 17 and 22 turned out to be extremely difficult. The tramway tracks had to be blown up using dynamite, which was in little supply already. The underground railroad posed even a bigger problem – its concrete ceiling was impossible to breach with simple pickaxes, that's why sandbags and flagstone were used to fortify most of the barricade. Those fortifications were systematically destroyed by German mortar fire, “Goliaths” and air support. The “Kilinski” Battalion worked on the southern part of the ditch.

The barricade was constructed in early August and it served an important role as the only connection between southern and northern parts of the city.

== The invincible barricade ==
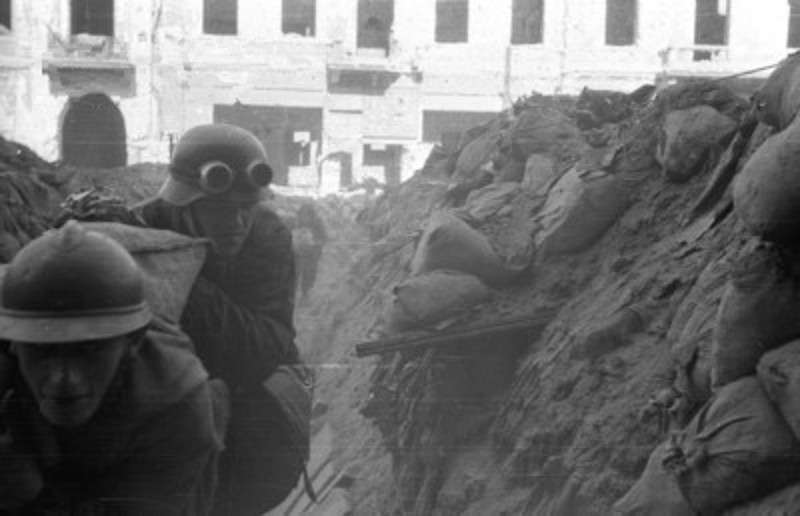
Soldiers of the Home Army in the baricade on Jerusalem Avenue, during the Warsaw Uprising, in September 1944

The biggest threat to the barricade was the close proximity of the enemy forces. The Germans were stationed in building No. 25 (just five buildings from the barricade), on the corner of Bracka St. in a small garden next the Bank Gospodarstwa Krajowego (BGK) building, and on the opposite side in the “Cristal” restaurant. The Germans managed to reach Krucza St. at night and create fortified positions. Battalions commander gave an order to neutralize these positions. An attack on building No. 25 was led by lt. “Zych” and lt. “Miś” on August 10, 1944 in the afternoon. In this successful attempt the insurgents managed to push back the Germans, take a few prisoners, capture a large amount of ammunition and weapons and free the tenants, who were crammed in the basement. An attack on the eastern side was led by lt. “Skiba”. Conducted during the night, it was successful in pushing back the Germans away from Bracka St. and out of the small garden next to the BGK building. This resulted in a new stronghold held by the insurgents on the corner of Jerusalem Avenue and Bracka St. In late September, after the Old Town and Powisle (riverside) have fallen, the enemy intensified his attacks from the Central Railway Station along Nowogrodzka St. and Jerusalem Avenue. The Germans tried to destroy the barricade in order to split the downtown area in two separate caldrons using the most gruesome methods such as “live shields” – forcing civilians to walk in front of advancing tanks. Commander of this area major “Sarna”, expected it and gave an order to fortify his positions. “Skiba” to take command over the entire crew that operated on the western section. The Germans had an enormous advantage over the insurgents in this area, especially in guns and firepower. “Skiba” said not to fallback even by a single step. The exhausting fighting continued during the night. In the most critical moment, when ammunition was in short supply – bottles filled with petrol were thrown into the action. Flames and fierce resistance of the insurgents managed to stop the Germans. 3 enemy “Goliaths” and 4 tanks were destroyed. The Germans did not regain control over the barricade and Jerusalem Avenue until the end of the uprising
