= Szczecno =

- Village
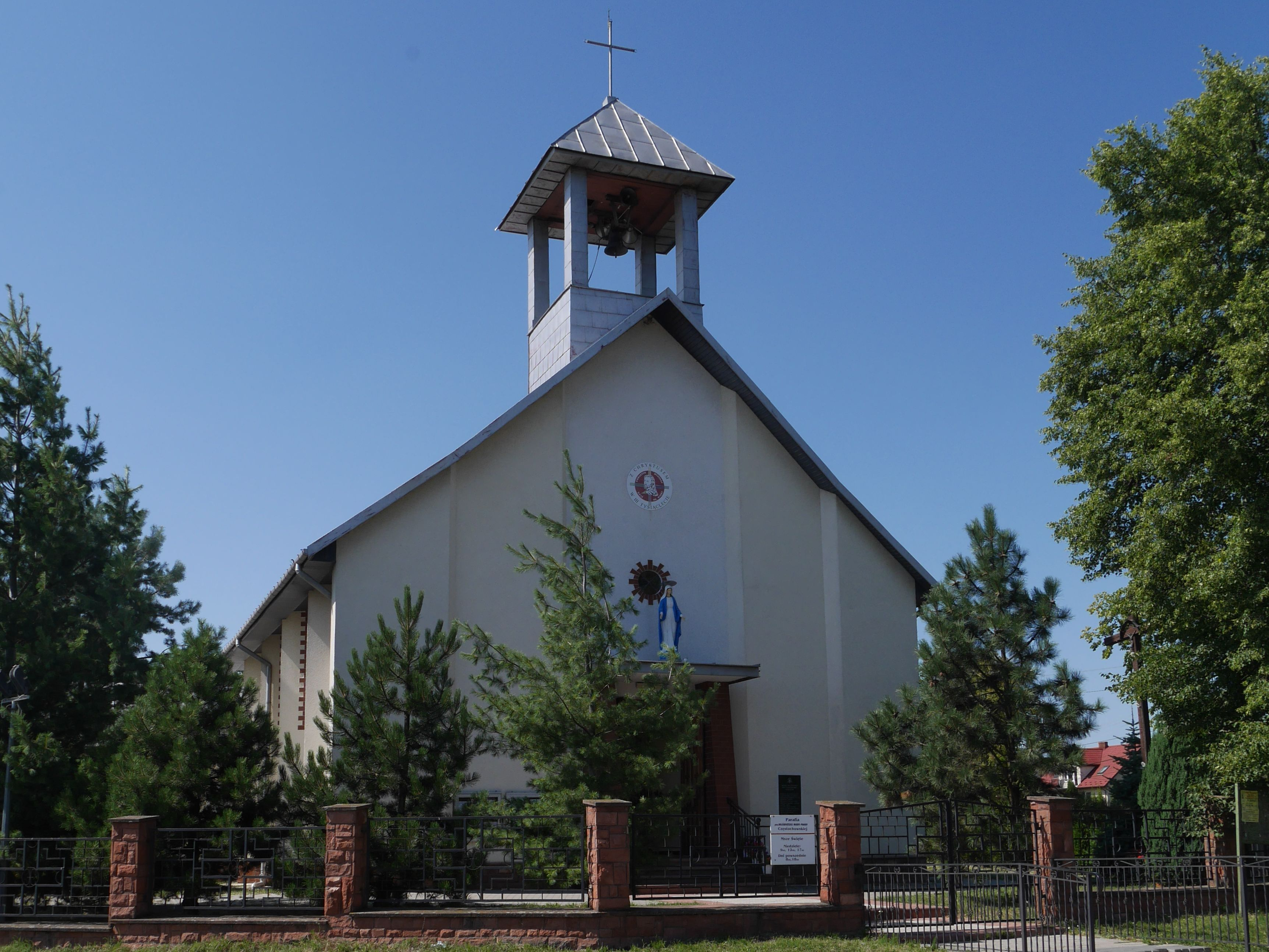
- Catholic church

- Location within Poland
- Coordinates: 50°43′50″N 20°46′35″E
- Country: Poland
- Voivodeship: Świętokrzyskie
- County: Kielce
- Gmina: Daleszyce
- Population: 740

Szczecno [ˈʂt͡ʂɛt͡snɔ] is a village in the administrative district of Gmina Daleszyce, within Kielce County, Świętokrzyskie Voivodeship, in south-central Poland. It lies approximately 9 km (6 mi) south of Daleszyce and 21 km (13 mi) south-east of the regional capital Kielce.
