= Marzysz =

- Village
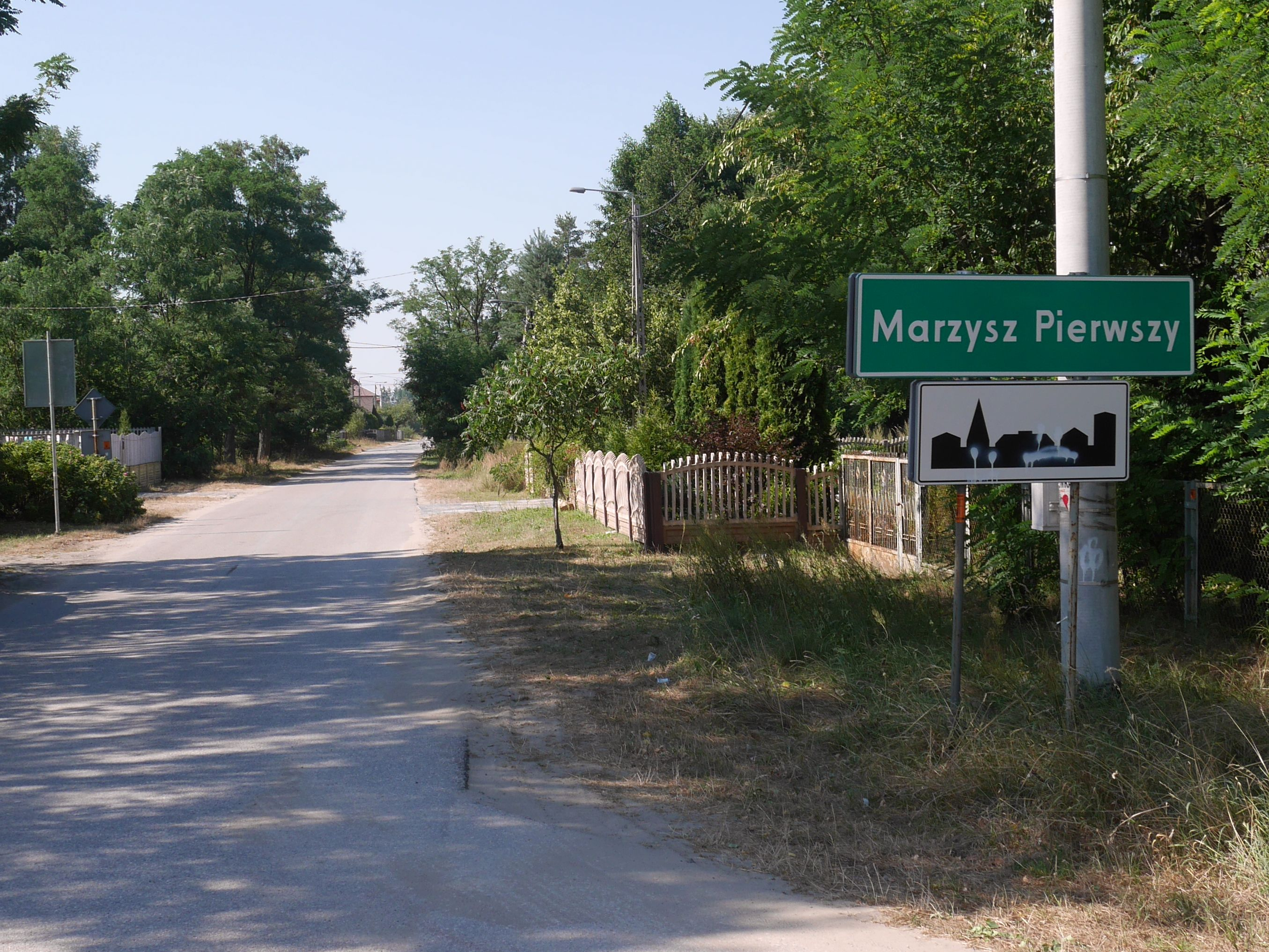

- Location within Poland
- Coordinates: 50°45′57″N 20°41′32″E
- Country: Poland
- Voivodeship: Świętokrzyskie
- County: Kielce
- Gmina: Daleszyce

Marzysz [ˈmaʐɨʂ] is a village in the administrative district of Gmina Daleszyce, within Kielce County, Świętokrzyskie Voivodeship, in south-central Poland. It lies approximately 10 km (6 mi) south-west of Daleszyce and 15 km (9 mi) south of the regional capital Kielce.
