= Brzechów =

- Village
- Location within Poland
- Coordinates: 50°49′38″N 20°47′18″E
- Country: Poland
- Voivodeship: Świętokrzyskie
- County: Kielce
- Gmina: Daleszyce
- Population: 870

Brzechów [ˈbʐɛxuf] is a village in the administrative district of Gmina Daleszyce, within Kielce County, Świętokrzyskie Voivodeship, in south-central Poland. It lies approximately 3 km (2 mi) north-west of Daleszyce and 13 km (8 mi) east of south-east of the regional capital Kielce.
