= Niwy =

Niwy may refer to the following places:

- Niwy, Bydgoszcz County in Kuyavian-Pomeranian Voivodeship (north-central Poland)
- Niwy, Sępólno County in Kuyavian-Pomeranian Voivodeship (north-central Poland)
- Niwy, Bełchatów County in Łódź Voivodeship (central Poland)
- Niwy, Piotrków County in Łódź Voivodeship (central Poland)
- Niwy, Świętokrzyskie Voivodeship (south-central Poland)
- Niwy, Gmina Herby in Silesian Voivodeship (south Poland)
- Niwy, Gmina Woźniki in Silesian Voivodeship (south Poland)
- Niwy, Lubusz Voivodeship (west Poland)
- Niwy, West Pomeranian Voivodeship (north-west Poland)
