= Komórki =

- Village
- Location within Poland
- Coordinates: 50°44′13″N 20°43′41″E
- Country: Poland
- Voivodeship: Świętokrzyskie
- County: Kielce
- Gmina: Daleszyce
- Population: 300

Komórki [kɔˈmurki] is a village in the administrative district of Gmina Daleszyce, within Kielce County, Świętokrzyskie Voivodeship, in south-central Poland. It lies approximately 10 km (6 mi) south-west of Daleszyce and 19 km (12 mi) south-east of the regional capital Kielce.
