= Widełki =

- Village
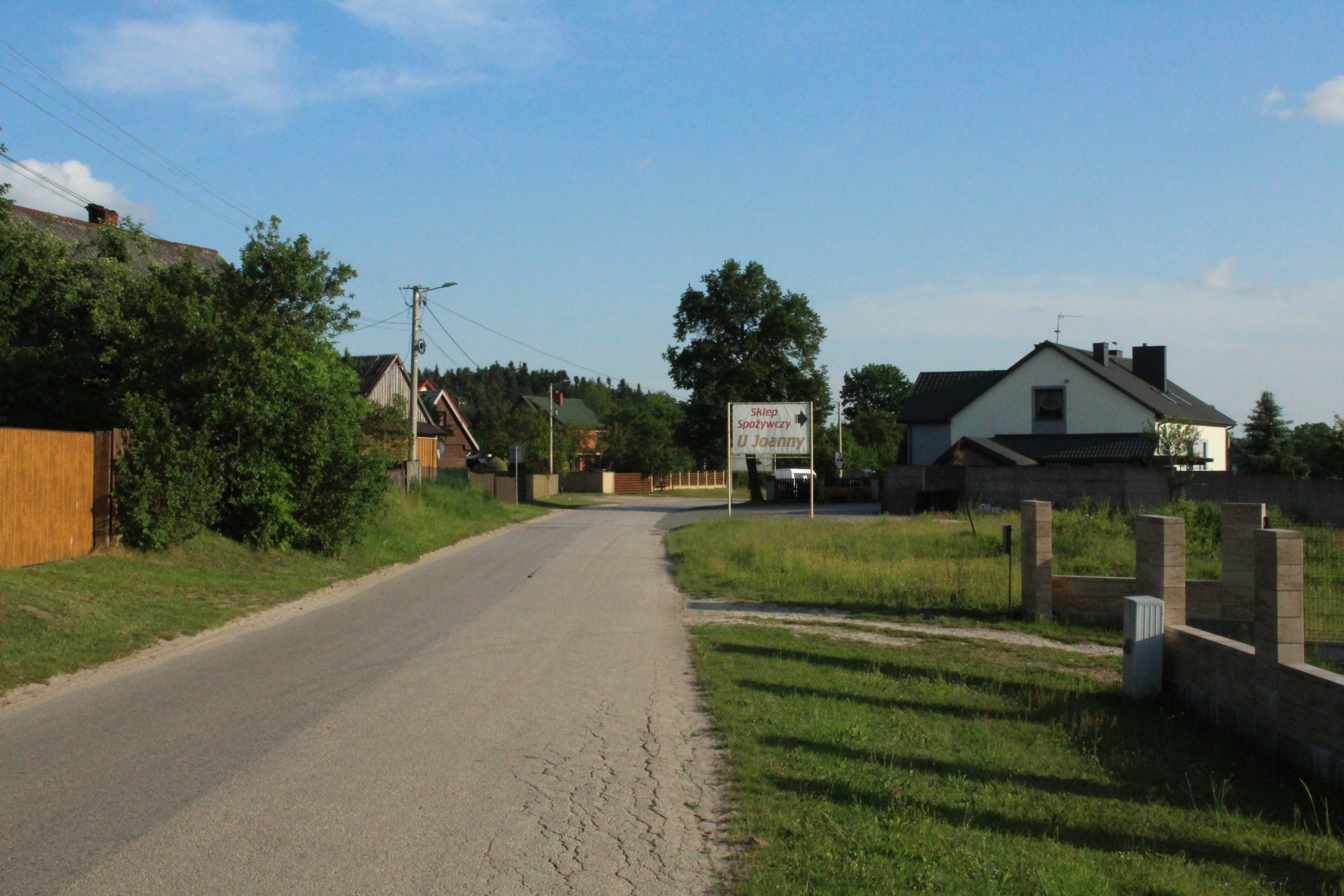

- Location within Poland
- Coordinates: 50°46′3″N 20°56′29″E
- Country: Poland
- Voivodeship: Świętokrzyskie
- County: Kielce
- Gmina: Daleszyce
- Population: 340

Widełki [viˈdɛu̯ki] is a village in the administrative district of Gmina Daleszyce, within Kielce County, Świętokrzyskie Voivodeship, in south-central Poland. It lies approximately 11 km (7 mi) south-east of Daleszyce and 27 km (17 mi) south-east of the regional capital Kielce.
