= Niwy, Świętokrzyskie Voivodeship =

Niwy
- Village
- Location within Poland
- Coordinates: 50°47′4″N 20°49′25″E
- Country: Poland
- Voivodeship: Świętokrzyskie
- County: Kielce
- Gmina: Daleszyce
- Population: 800

Niwy [ˈnivɨ] is a village in the administrative district of Gmina Daleszyce, within Kielce County, Świętokrzyskie Voivodeship, in south-central Poland. It lies approximately 3 km (2 mi) south-east of Daleszyce and 19 km (12 mi) south-east of the regional capital Kielce.
