= Chęciny County =

Coordinates: 50.8°N 20.46°E

Chęciny County (Polish: Powiat chęciński) was an administrative territorial entity of the Kingdom of Poland and later the Polish–Lithuanian Commonwealth. It is unknown when it was established, probably some time in the 14th century. It was located in the central part of the Sandomierz Voivodeship, with the seat in the historic town of Checiny and among others, it included Kielce, Przedborz, Secemin, Malogoszcz, Wloszczowa and Daleszyce. Total area of the county was almost 3000 sq. kilometres.

The county ceased to exist in 1796 when, after the Third Partition of Poland, it was annexed by the Austrian Empire, and its seat was moved to Kielce.

== Sources ==
- "Gmina Sitkówka-Nowiny" (in Polish).
