= Borków, Kielce County =

Borków
- Village
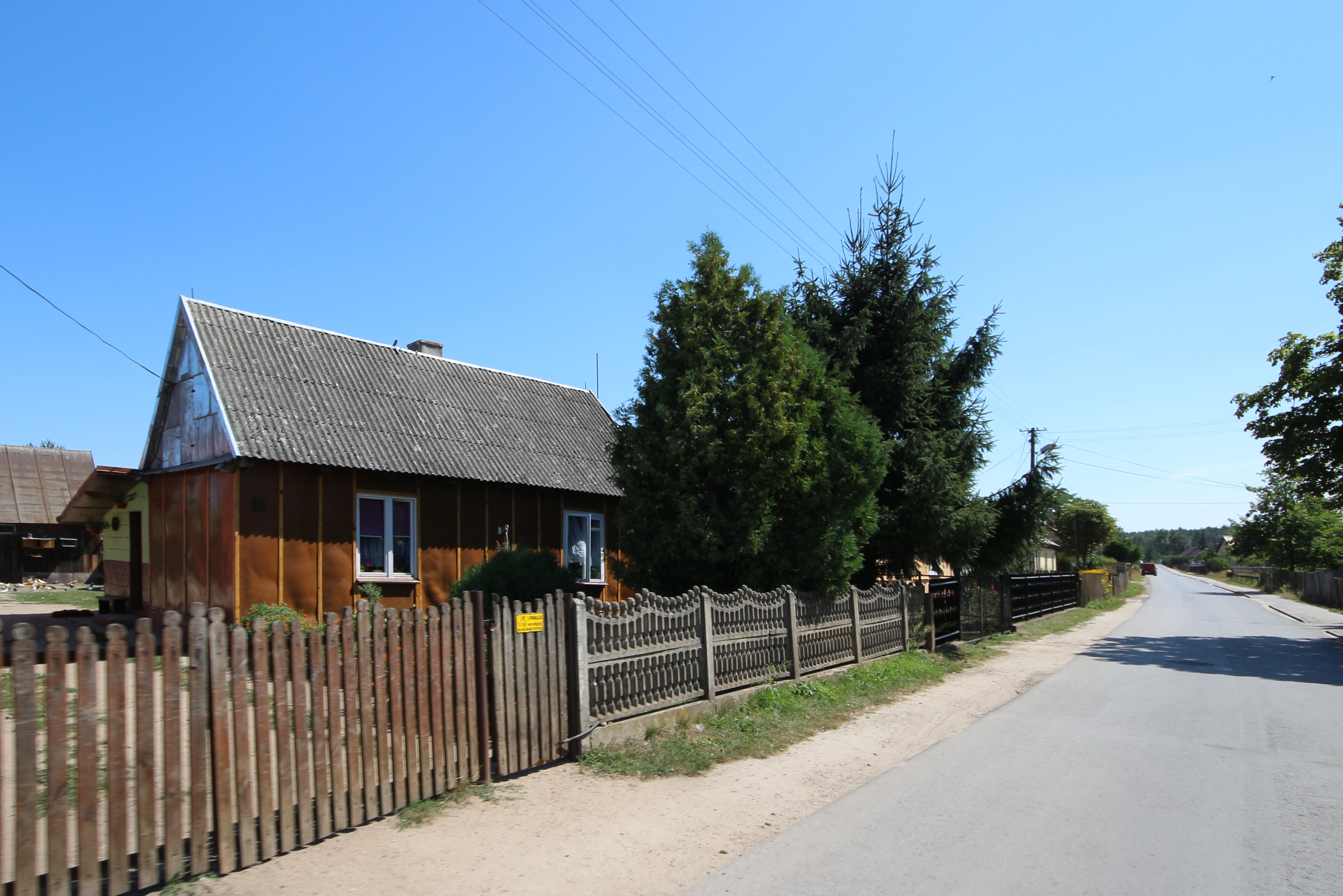

- Location within Poland
- Coordinates: 50°46′7″N 20°45′17″E
- Country: Poland
- Voivodeship: Świętokrzyskie
- County: Kielce
- Gmina: Daleszyce
- Population (approx.): 360

Borków [ˈbɔrkuf] is a village in the administrative district of Gmina Daleszyce, within Kielce County, Świętokrzyskie Voivodeship, in south-central Poland. It lies approximately 6 km (4 mi) south-west of Daleszyce and 17 km (11 mi) south-east of the regional capital Kielce.
