= Gmina Daleszyce =

Gmina Daleszyce Daleszyce Commune
- Gmina
- Coat of arms
- Interactive map of Gmina Daleszyce
- Coordinates (Daleszyce): 50°48′13″N 20°48′27″E
- Country: Poland
- Voivodeship: Świętokrzyskie
- County: Kielce County
- Seat: Daleszyce

Area
  - Total: 222.18 km^{2} (85.78 sq mi)

Population (2006)
  - Total: 14,713
  - Density: 66.221/km^{2} (171.51/sq mi)
  - Urban: 2,800
  - Rural: 11,913
- Website: https://www.daleszyce.pl

Gmina Daleszyce is an urban-rural gmina (administrative district) in Kielce County, Świętokrzyskie Voivodeship, in south-central Poland. Its seat is the town of Daleszyce, which lies approximately 17 kilometres (11 mi) south-east of the regional capital Kielce.

The gmina covers an area of 222.18 square kilometres (85.8 sq mi), and as of 2006 its total population is 14,713 (out of which the population of Daleszyce amounts to 2,800, and the population of the rural part of the gmina is 11,913).

The gmina contains part of the protected area called Cisów-Orłowiny Landscape Park.

== Villages ==
Apart from the town of Daleszyce, Gmina Daleszyce contains the villages and settlements of Borków, Brzechów, Cisów, Danków, Komórki, Kranów, Marzysz, Mójcza, Niestachów, Niwy, Sieraków, Słopiec, Smyków, Suków, Szczecno, Trzemosna and Widełki.

== Neighbouring gminas ==
Gmina Daleszyce is bordered by the city of Kielce and by the gminas of Bieliny, Górno, Łagów, Morawica, Pierzchnica and Raków.
