= Sieraków, Świętokrzyskie Voivodeship =

Sieraków
- Village
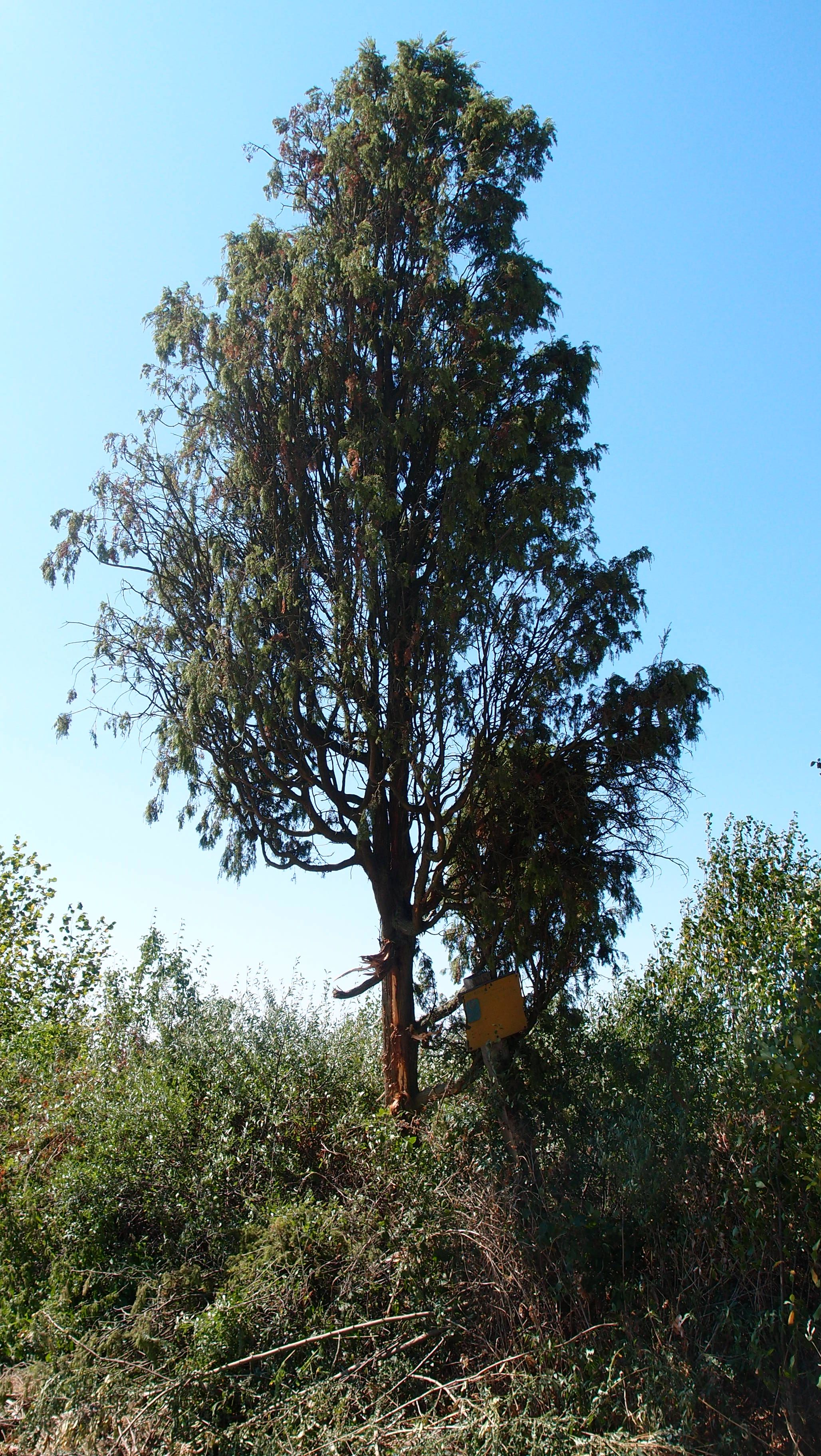

- Location within Poland
- Coordinates: 50°48′27″N 20°53′11″E
- Country: Poland
- Voivodeship: Świętokrzyskie
- County: Kielce
- Gmina: Daleszyce
- Population: 200

Sieraków (Polish pronunciation: [ɕɛˈrakuf]) is a village in the administrative district of Gmina Daleszyce, within Kielce County, Świętokrzyskie Voivodeship, in south-central Poland. It lies approximately 6 km (4 mi) east of Daleszyce and 21 km (13 mi) south-east of the regional capital Kielce.
