= Wiślica County =

Administrative territorial entity

Wiślica County (Polish: Powiat wiślicki) was an administrative territorial entity of the Kingdom of Poland and later Polish–Lithuanian Commonwealth. It is unknown when it was established, probably some time in the 15th century, based on a medieval castellany. It was located in the central part of the Sandomierz Voivodeship, with the capital in the historic town of Wiślica. The county ceased to exist in 1795, when after the Third Partition of Poland, it was annexed by Austrian Empire.

In the 16th and 17th centuries, the area of Wislica County was 2,429 km^{2}, with thirteen towns. Major administrative center of the county was Wislica, whose population in late 16th century was 2,000. Szydlow, the second largest town, had a population of 1,500, while Pinczow and Nowy Korczyn, had a population of 1,200. Other main towns were Opatowiec Busko, Pacanow and Stopnica.

== Sources ==
- History of Wislica County
