= Danków, Świętokrzyskie Voivodeship =

Danków
- Village
- Location within Poland
- Coordinates: 50°48′38″N 20°50′6″E
- Country: Poland
- Voivodeship: Świętokrzyskie
- County: Kielce
- Gmina: Daleszyce
- Population: 430

Danków [ˈdankuf] is a village in the administrative district of Gmina Daleszyce, within Kielce County, Świętokrzyskie Voivodeship, in south-central Poland. It lies approximately 3 km (2 mi) east of Daleszyce and 18 km (11 mi) south-east of the regional capital Kielce.
