= Pilzno County =

Historical county in Poland

Pilzno County (Polish: Powiat pilznenski) was an administrative territorial entity of the Kingdom of Poland and later Polish–Lithuanian Commonwealth. It is unknown when it was established, probably some time in the 15th century. It was located in the southernmost corner of the Sandomierz Voivodeship and within its borders were such towns as Tarnów, Debica, Mielec, Kolbuszowa, Sedziszow Malopolski and Ropczyce. It ceased to exist in 1774, following the Partitions of Poland, when Austrian government moved its capital to Tarnow.

In 1867, following territorial reorganization of Galicia, the Austrians created the Pilzno county again, and it existed until 1931, when government of the Second Polish Republic merged it with the Ropczyce County and moved the capital firstly to Ropczyce and then in 1936 to Debica.

== Sources ==
- History of the Pilzno County
- Pilzno - history
