= Sierakowo =

Sierakowo may refer to:

- Sierakowo, Golub-Dobrzyń County in Kuyavian-Pomeranian Voivodeship (north-central Poland)
- Sierakowo, Mogilno County in Kuyavian-Pomeranian Voivodeship (north-central Poland)
- Sierakowo, Płońsk County in Masovian Voivodeship (east-central Poland)
- Sierakowo, Przasnysz County in Masovian Voivodeship (east-central Poland)
- Sierakowo, Kościan County in Greater Poland Voivodeship (west-central Poland)
- Sierakowo, Rawicz County in Greater Poland Voivodeship (west-central Poland)
- Sierakowo, Słupca County in Greater Poland Voivodeship (west-central Poland)
- Sierakowo, Police County in West Pomeranian Voivodeship (north-west Poland)
- Sierakowo, Stargard County in West Pomeranian Voivodeship (north-west Poland)
