= Sandomierz Voivodeship =

Voivodeship of the Crown of the Kingdom of Poland

Coordinates: 50°40′52″N 21°44′40″E

Sandomierz Voivodeship Palatinatus Sandomirensis Województwo Sandomierskie
- Voivodeship of Poland
- 14th century–1795
- Coat of arms

- Sandomierz Voivodeship in the Polish–Lithuanian Commonwealth in 1635.
- Capital: Sandomierz
- Area
- 23,860 km^{2} (9,210 sq mi)
- History
  - Established: 14th century
  - First partition: August 5, 1772
  - Third partition: 24 October 1795
- Political subdivisions: counties: 7 (as for 1662)
Preceded by	Succeeded by
Crown of the Kingdom of Poland; Polish–Lithuanian Commonwealth	Kingdom of Galicia and Lodomeria; New Galicia
- Today part of: Poland

Sandomierz Voivodeship (Polish: Województwo Sandomierskie, Latin: Palatinatus Sandomirensis) was a unit of administration and local government in Poland from the 14th century to the partitions of Poland in 1772–1795. It was part of the Lesser Poland region and the Lesser Poland Province. Originally Sandomierz Voivodeship also covered the area around Lublin, but in 1474 its three eastern counties were organized into Lublin Voivodeship. In the 16th century, it had 374 parishes, 100 towns and 2586 villages. The voivodeship was based on the Sandomierz ziemia, which earlier was the Duchy of Sandomierz. The Duchy of Sandomierz was created in 1138 by King Bolesław III Wrymouth, who in his testament divided Poland into five principalities. One of them, with the capital at Sandomierz, was assigned to Krzywousty's son, Henry of Sandomierz. Later on, with southern part of the Seniorate Province (which emerged into the Duchy of Kraków), the Duchy of Sandomierz created Lesser Poland, divided into Kraków and Sandomierz Voivodeships.

Sandomierz Voivodeship was also one of the voivodeships of Congress Poland. Created in 1816 from the Radom Department, in 1837 it was transformed into the Sandomierz Governorate.

== 14th century – 1795 ==
=== Boundaries ===
Sandomierz Voivodeship in its original shape was one of the largest provinces of the Kingdom of Poland. After Lublin Voivodeship was created out of its eastern territories, the province stretched from Białobrzegi in the north, to the area north of Krosno in the south (the town of Krosno itself belonged to Red Ruthenia). It included such cities and towns of contemporary Poland, as Dębica, Dęblin, Iłża, Kielce, Kolbuszowa, Końskie, Kozienice, Lipsko, Mielec, Nisko, Opoczno, Ostrowiec Świętokrzyski, Pińczów, Pionki, Radom, Ropczyce, Ryki, Stalowa Wola, Starachowice, Staszów, Szydłowiec, Tarnów, Tarnobrzeg and Włoszczowa. The shape of the voivodeship remained unchanged from 1474 to the first partition of Poland (1772), when the Habsburg monarchy annexed the area south of the Vistula, with Dębica, Kolbuszowa, Mielec, Nisko and Tarnów.

Zygmunt Gloger in his monumental book Historical Geography of the Lands of Old Poland gives a detailed description of Sandomierz Voivodeship:

“Duke Boleslaw Krzywousty, before his death in 1138, divided Poland between his four sons, giving Henryk the Land of Sandomierz together with the Land of Lublin. The Duchy of Sandomierz was thus created (...)

During the reign of Wladyslaw Lokietek, the duchy was turned into a large voivodeship. In ca. 1471, the Land of Lublin was separated from it (...) The area of Sandomierz Voivodeship was 467 square miles, with 374 Roman Catholic parishes, 100 towns, and 2,586 villages. In 1397 left bank part of the province was divided into three counties – Sandomierz, Radom and Checiny. In the early 16th century the voivodeship had 9 counties: Sandomierz, Wislica, Checiny, Opoczno, Radom, Szydłów, Stezyca, Pilzno and Tarnów. By late 16th century, Tarnow county was annexed by Pilzno county, while Szydlow county was divided between Wislica and Sandomierz (...)

Sandomierz Voivodeship had nine senators: the voivode and the castellan of Sandomierz, and castellans of Wislica, Radom, Zawichost, Żarnów, Malogoszcz, Połaniec and Czchow. The voivodeship had several starostas, who resided in such towns, as Sandomierz, Radom, Checiny, Opoczno, Nowy Korczyn, Stezyca, Wislica, Pilzno, Stopnica, Solec nad Wisla, Zawichost, Szydlow, Przedborz, Ropczyce, Ryczywol, Radoszyce, Ryki, Zwolen, Gołąb and others. Local sejmiks took place at Opatow, at which seven deputies to the Sejm were elected, as well as two deputies to the Lesser Poland Tribunal in Lublin (...)

The soil in the northern part of the voivodeship was sandy, while in its center and south it was very rich. In the area of Opatow, famous wheat was produced, called sandomierka or opatowka. There also were large forests, as well as deposits of marble, copper, iron and lime (...) Among oldest urban centers of Sandomierz Voivodeship were Sandomierz, Wislica, Nowy Korczyn, Zawichost, Radom. Main castles were at Chrobrze, Osiek, Ilza, Checiny, Janowiec nad Wisla. Most important monasteries were at Lysa Gora, Sieciechow, Opatow, Wachock and Koprzywnica".

=== Municipal government ===
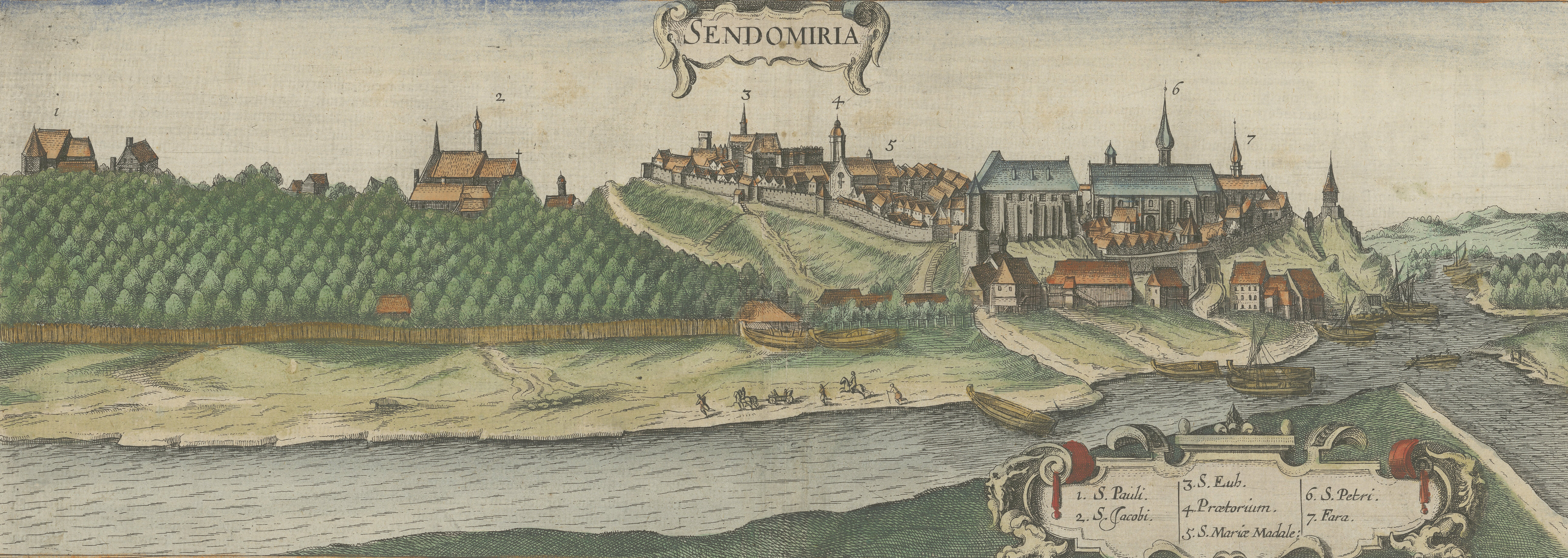
Sandomierz, capital of the voivodeship, in the 17th century

Voivodeship Governor (Wojewoda) seat:

- Sandomierz

Regional council (sejmik generalny) seats:

- Nowe Miasto Korczyn

== Administrative division ==
In 1397, part of the Sandomierz Voivodeship which was located on the western bank of the Vistula, was divided into three counties:

- Sandomierz County (Powiat Sandomierski), Sandomierz
- Radom County (Powiat Radomski), Radom, which was traditionally called Radom Land (Ziemia radomska)
- Chęciny County (Powiat Chęciński), Chęciny.

In 1662, Sandomierz Voivodeship consisted of the following counties:

- Sandomierz County,
- Chęciny County,
- Wiślica County,
- Stężyca County,
- Radom County,
- Opoczno County,
- Pilzno County.

=== Voivodes ===
- Jan z Melsztyna (since 1361)
- Jan z Tarnowa (before 1385)
- Spytek z Tarnowa i Jarosławia (since 1433)
- Jan Feliks "Szram" Tarnowski (since 1501)
- Mikołaj Firlej (since 1514)
- Jan Kostka (since 1574)
- Jerzy Mniszech (since 1590)
- Jan Zbigniew Ossoliński (since 1613)
- Stanisław Koniecpolski (since 1625 to 1633),
- Mikołaj Firlej (1633–1635)
- Jerzy Ossoliński (XI 1636-III 1638)
- Krzysztof Ossoliński (since IV 1638 to 1645)
- Władysław Dominik Zasławski (since 1649)
- Aleksander Koniecpolski (since 1656)
- Jan "Sobiepan" Zamoyski (since 1659)
- Jerzy Aleksander Lubomirski (since 1729)
- Jan Tarło (since 1736)

== Cities and towns of Sandomierz Voivodeship (1662) ==
=== Cities and towns of Sandomierz County ===
- Sandomierz,
- Opatów,
- Koprzywnica (Pokrzywnica),
- Połaniec,
- Osiek,
- Staszów,
- Łagów,
- Nowa Słupia,
- Bodzentyn,
- Wąchock,
- Ćmielów,
- Kunów,
- Lasocin,
- Rudnik nad Sanem,
- Iwaniska,
- Zawichost,
- Tarłów,
- Mielec,
- Janików,
- Ożarów,
- Waśniów.

=== Cities and towns of Chęciny County ===
- Chęciny,
- Przedbórz,
- Kurzelów,
- Secemin,
- Małogoszcz,
- Włoszczowa,
- Oksa (Oxa),
- Sobków,
- Daleszyce.

=== Cities and towns of Wiślica County ===
- Wiślica,
- Nowy Korczyn,
- Szydłów,
- Pierzchnica (Pierśnica),
- Pińczów,
- Busko,
- Opatowiec,
- Pacanów,
- Żabno,
- Stopnica (Stobnica),
- Kurozwęki,
- Oleśnica,
- Chmielnik.

=== Cities and towns of Stężyca County ===
- Stężyca,
- Żelechów,
- Łaskarzew,
- Bobrowniki,
- Okrzeja,
- Adamów (Jadamów),
- Jeziorzany (known in 1662 as Łysobyki),
- Wojcieszków,
- Maciejowice.

=== Cities and towns of Radom County ===
- Radom,
- Ciepielów,
- Skaryszew,
- Iłża,
- Szydłowiec,
- Zwoleń,
- Przytyk,
- Wierzbnik (now a district of Starachowice),
- Jedlińsk (Jedleńsko),
- Odechów,
- Jastrząb,
- Nieznamierowice (Znamierowice),
- Klwów,
- Skrzynno,
- Sieciechów,
- Solec nad Wisłą,
- Kozienice.

=== Cities and towns of Opoczno County ===
- Opoczno,
- Gowarczów,
- Białaczów,
- Fałków,
- Odrzywół,
- Drzewica,
- Gielniów.

=== Cities and towns of Pilzno County ===
- Pilzno,
- Strzyżów,
- Rzochów,
- Tuchów,
- Brzostek,
- Ropczyce,
- Frysztak,
- Kołaczyce,
- Sędziszów Małopolski,
- Dębica,
- Wielopole Skrzyńskie,
- Czudec,
- Głogów Małopolski,
- Niebylec,
- Przecław,
- Tarnów,
- Brzyska (Rzyska),
- Radomyśl Wielki.

== Neighbouring Voivodeships ==
- Rawa Voivodeship
- Mazovian Voivodeship
- Lublin Voivodeship
- Ruthenian Voivodeship
- Kraków Voivodeship
- Sieradz Voivodeship
- Łęczyca Voivodeship

== 1939 ==
Sandomierz Voivodeship was also a proposed voivodeship of Second Polish Republic, which never was created because of the Nazi and Soviet invasion of Poland in September 1939. The idea of creation of this unit was the brainchild of Minister of Industry and Trade Eugeniusz Kwiatkowski, and it was directly linked with creation of one of the biggest economic projects of interbellum Poland, Central Industrial Region. It was to cover south-central Poland, and most probably, it was to be created in late 1939. Its projected size was 24.500 square kilometers, and it was to incorporate 20 or 21 powiats.
