= Bełt Battalion =

Bełt Battalion was a military unit of the Home Army which operated in the German-occupied Poland in the structures of the Military Service of Uprising's Defense. The battalion was formed from the IV Group WSOP and took an active part in the Warsaw Uprising in Subdistrict of Srodmiescie Poludniowe.

== Conspiracy ==
The battalion was formed between 1940 and 1941 in the 3rd region of the Srodmiescie district which included Srodmiescie, Powisle, and Stare Miasto (Old town). In the beginning, there was only the 331st company which was later accompanied by the 332nd. An engineers’ unit was added later as well, the battalion counted 180 soldiers. In July 1944 the battalion was a part of the VI Group of the Military Service of Uprising's Defense. The unit took its name from the codename of its commander Erwin Brennesen, “Bolt”.

The area of operation included: Jerozolimskie Avenue, streets: Poznanska, Lwowska, Nowowiejska, Sucha, Wawelska, Raszynska.

Prior to the uprising, the battalion was issued with reconnaissance of enemy-occupied buildings including the Ministry of Communications on Chałubinskiego Street and J.Słowackiego Gymnasium building on Wawelska Street.

== Order of battle of the VI Group WSOP 31st of August 1944 ==
- Commander – plut. Engineer Erwin Brennesen “Bolt Andtoni”
- 1st deputy commander – lt. Stefan Bigelmajer “Strzeminski”
- 2nd deputy commander – lt. Adam Krajewski “Zych”
- Training officer – lt. Waclaw Zochowski “Stoklosa”
- Engineer's officer – lt. Jozef Lowinski “Bylinski Stanislaw”
- Staff officer – lt. Franciszek Lewanda
- 31st Company WSOP – commander lt. Kazimierz Przecławski "Budzisz Ignacy"
- Platoon 311 – lt. Mieczysław Veidt "Manowski"
- Platoon 312 – unknown
- 32nd Company WSOP – commander lt. Ignacy Łyskanowski "Skiba Włodzimierz";
- Platoon 321 – commander lt. Juliusz Normark "Szwed";
- Platoon 322 – commander lt. Bronisław Glancer "Bronisławski";

=== Organization during the uprising ===
- Commander – lt. Erwin Brenneisen “Bolt”
- 1st deputy commander – lt. Stefan Bigelmajer "Strzemiński" (commander from September 14)
- 2nd deputy commander – lt. Adam Krajewski "Zych"
- 1st company – commander lt. Ignacy Łyskanowski "Skiba Włodzimierz";

== Battle trail ==
The area of operations of the battalion covered odd side of Jerozolimskie Avenue, Marszalkowska Street, Three Crosses Square, Bracka Street and Nowy Swiat Street. The most important task of the battalion was to unable the Germans from marching through Jerozolimskie Avenue. Additionally, the battalion was ordered to build and protect a communication ditch which was to connect southern and northern parts of Srodmiescie. Heavy fights in defense of the ditch took place in early August.

Particularly hard fighting took place during the recapture of the Firefighter School Building on Nowy Swiat Street. The building was strategically important as it closed access to the Three Crosses Square for the Germans.

In late September the Germans had intensified their attacks from the Central Railway Station along Nowogrodzka Street and Jerozolimskie Avenue in order to split Srodmiescie in half. Three “goliaths” and four tanks were destroyed by the battalion in that section. The Germans never regained control of Jerozolimskie Avenue.

== Sources ==
- Bartelski L., Powstanie warszawskie, Warszawa 1981.
- Komornicki S., Na barykadach Warszawy, Warszawa 1981.
- Oddziały Powstania Warszawskiego, Warszawa 1984.
- Powstanie warszawskie 1944. Wybór dokumentów, Tom 2, Część I, Warszawa 2001 ISBN 83-88185-39-X
