= Daleszyce =

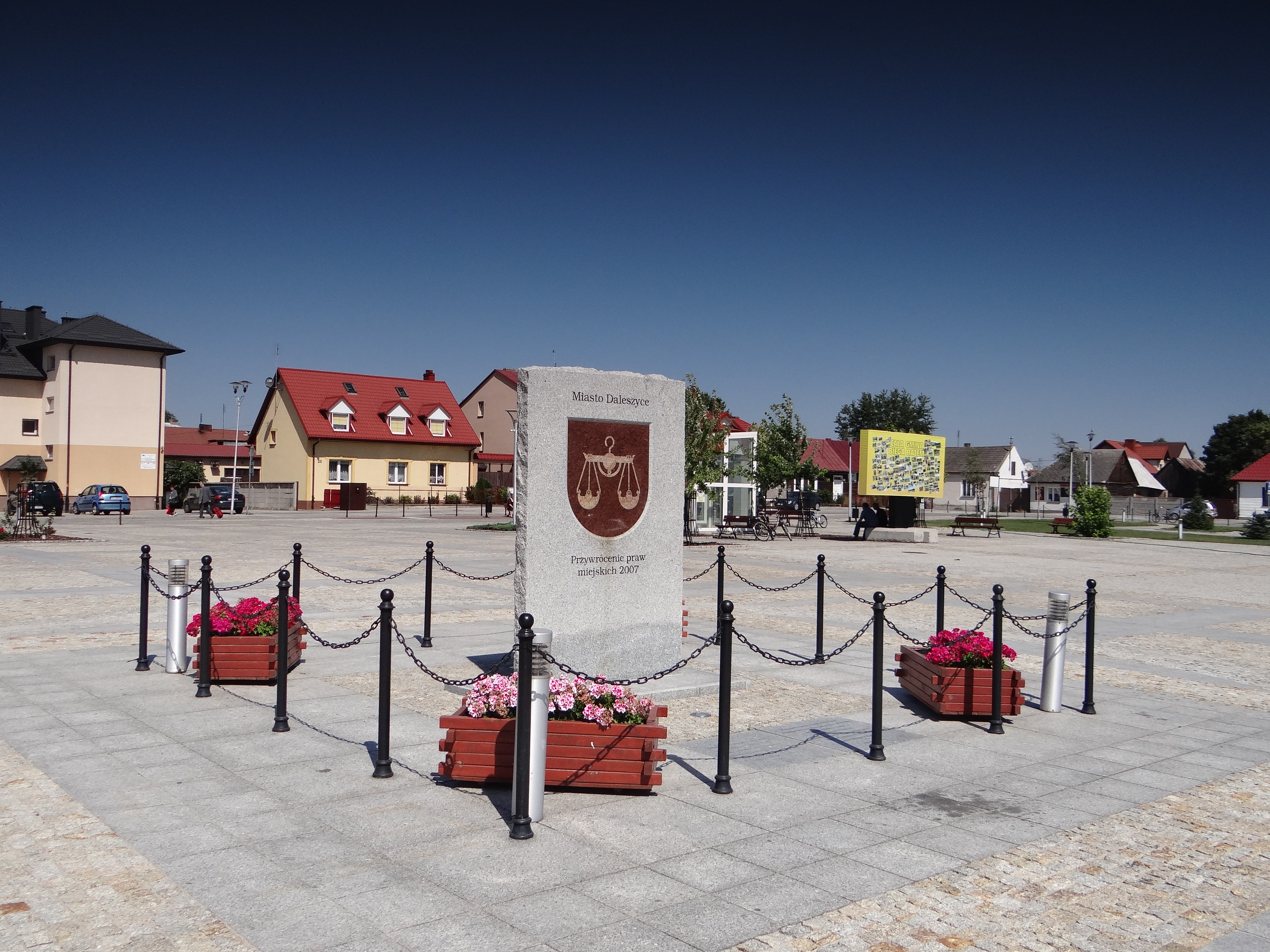
- Marketplace

- Coat of arms

- Location within Poland
- Coordinates: 50°48′13″N 20°48′27″E
- Country: Poland
- Voivodeship: Świętokrzyskie
- County: Kielce
- Gmina: Daleszyce
- Town rights: 1569-1869, 2007

Government
  - Mayor: Dariusz Meresiński (Ind.)

Area
  - Total: 15.50 km^{2} (5.98 sq mi)

Population (31 December 2021)
  - Total: 2,830
  - Density: 183/km^{2} (473/sq mi)
- Time zone: UTC+1 (CET)
  - Summer (DST): UTC+2 (CEST)
- Postal code: 26-021
- Area code: +48 41
- Climate: Dfb
- Car plates: TKI
- Website: http://www.daleszyce.pl

Daleszyce [dalɛˈʂɨt͡sɛ] is a town in Kielce County, Świętokrzyskie Voivodeship, in south-central Poland, with 2,830 inhabitants as of December 2021. It became a town at the start of 2007. Daleszyce lies among the hills of the Malopolska Upland, in the historic region of Lesser Poland. The area of the town is 15.50 km^{2} (5.98 sq mi), and due to proximity to Kielce, it is served by buses of Kielce Transit System. Origins of its name are not known, Daleszyce was probably named after its founder, a man named Dalesz or Dalech.

== History ==
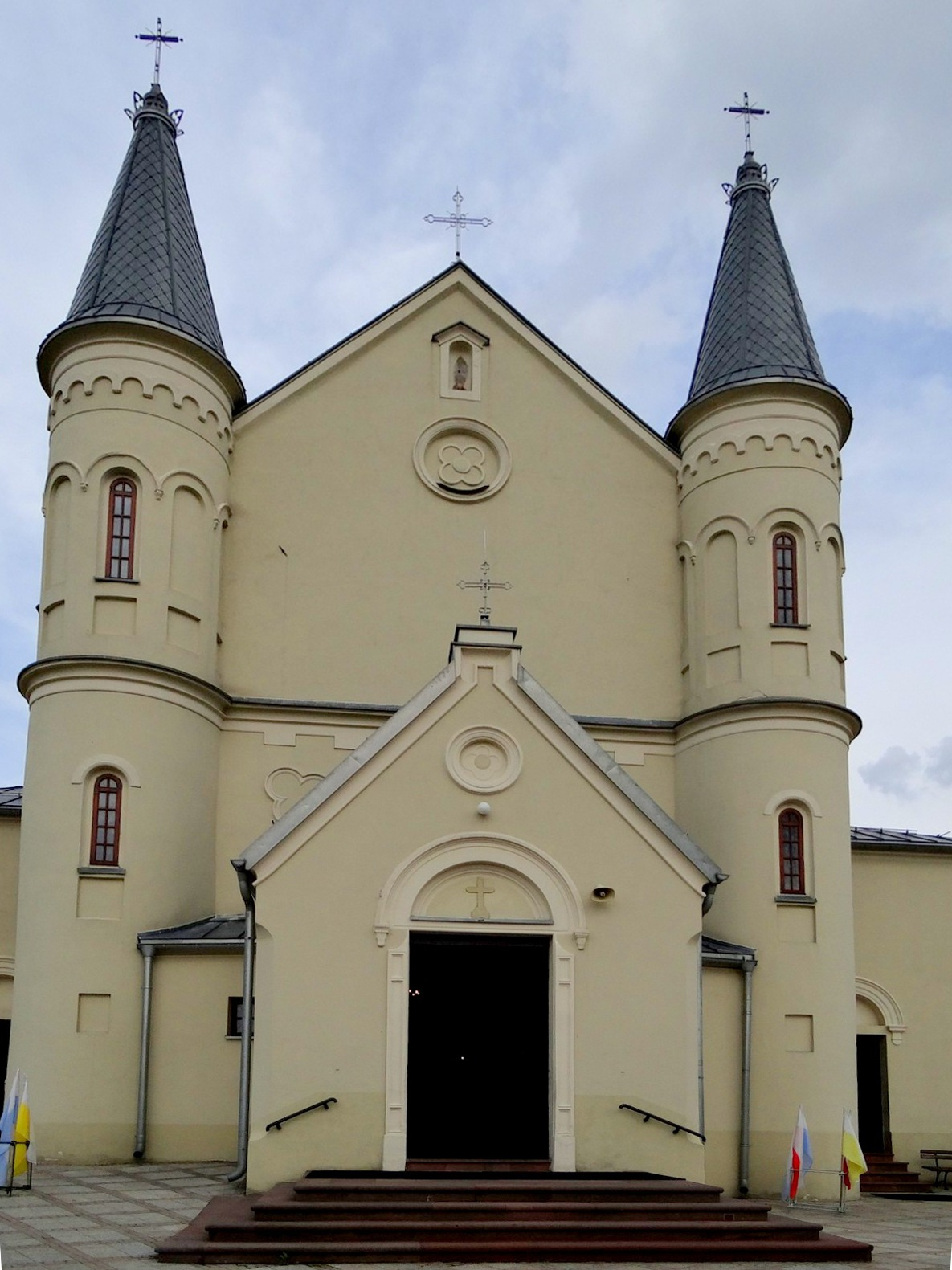
Saint Michael Archangel church

First mention of Daleszyce comes from Jan Długosz’s chronicle Annales seu cronici incliti regni Poloniae. Długosz wrote that in 1222, Bishop of Kraków Iwo Odrowąż funded St. Michael church here, which means that the village must have existed before that year. Daleszyce was located near two merchant routes - east-west (from Sandomierz and Opatów to Wieluń and Opole), and south-north (from Wiślica and Nowy Korczyn to Sieradz and Piotrków). In 1241, after the Battle of Chmielnik (see Mongol invasion of Poland), Daleszyce was burned, together with the church.

During the reign of King Casimir III the Great, Daleszyce, which was property of Bishops of Kraków, remained a village, but it had a parish church, which elevated its status. In 1569, Bishop Filip Padniewski received from King Sigismund II Augustus permission to grant Magdeburg rights to the village of Daleszyce. The new town was given a coat of arms, and its market square was expanded, with streets stemming from it. The 16th century shape of town’s center has not changed since then. Daleszyce had a town hall and a local government, together with a wójt. Every Tuesday there was a fair, and bishop Padniewski allowed town’s residents to collect timber in nearby woods. Daleszyce was a trade center of local importance, there also were artisans, such as blacksmiths, tailors, butchers and potters. Furthermore, the town had a brick manufacture, two water mills and open pit iron ore mine. Daleszyce was administratively located in the Chęciny County in the Sandomierz Voivodeship in the Lesser Poland Province.

Daleszyce prospered until the mid-17th century, when, during the Deluge, Polish–Lithuanian Commonwealth was invaded by the Swedish Empire. During the siege of Chęciny, the invaders ransacked and burned Daleszyce, and the town never recovered from the destruction. In the 18th century, Daleszyce remained a poor town, with most houses made of timber, as it was the cheapest building material. In the Third Partition of Poland of 1795, Daleszyce was annexed by the Austrian Empire. Following the Polish victory in the Austro-Polish War of 1809, it became part of the short-lived Polish Duchy of Warsaw, and in 1815, after the duchy's dissolution it became part of Russian-controlled Congress Poland. In 1820, the town had 232 houses and 1270 inhabitants, and its role as a local trade center was taken over by the quickly developing nearby city of Kielce. Since the mid 19th century, the number of Jews grew, and in 1894, a wooden synagogue was built. Daleszyce officially remained a town, but it looked like a large village.

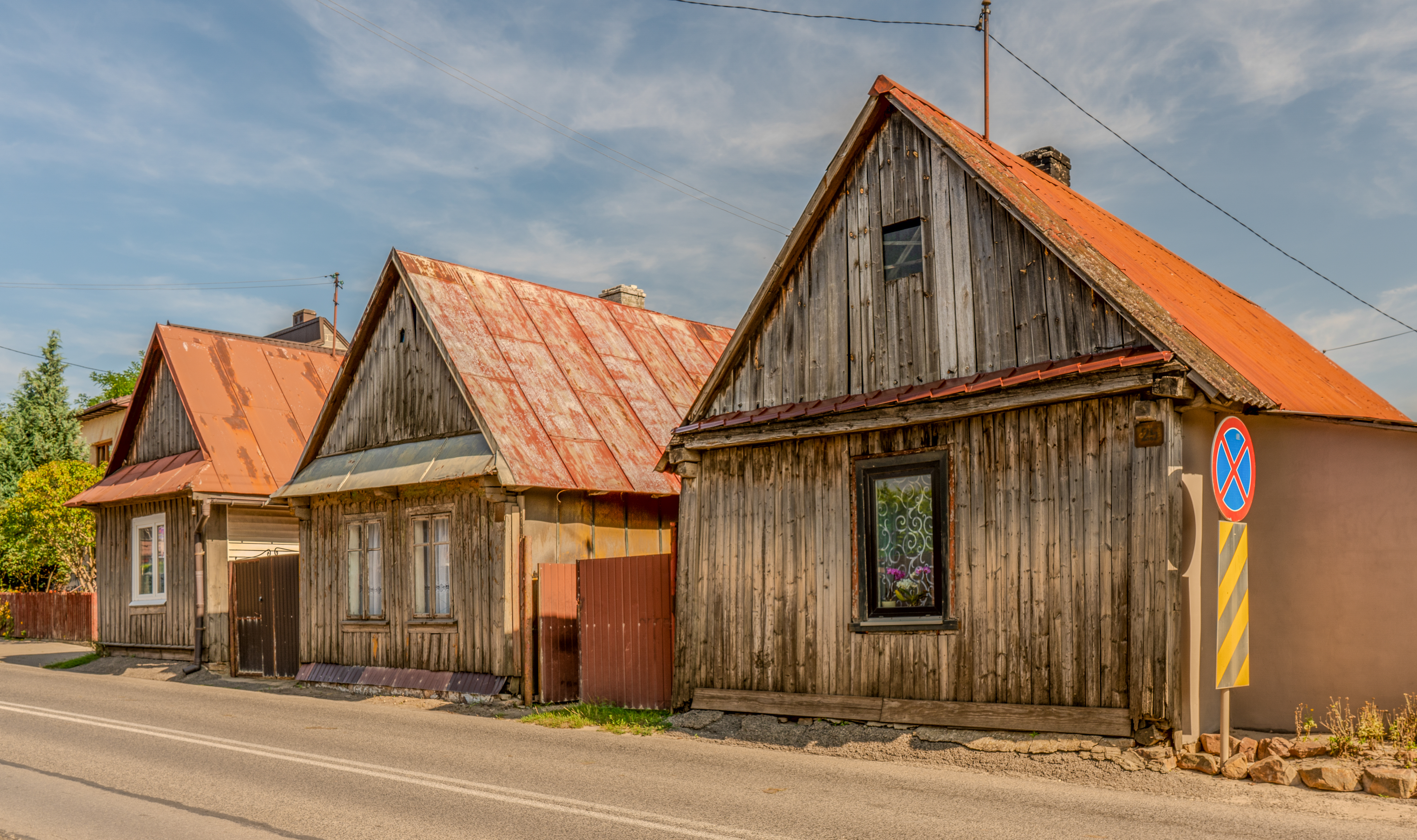
Preserved old wooden houses

Residents of Daleszyce took active role in January Uprising, forming a local unit under Wawrzyniec Cedro. They camped in a nearby forest, where graves of the 1860s Polish rebels can still be found. In 1865, as a punishment, Tsar Alexander II stripped Daleszyce of its town charter, and imposed a fine on the village. In the Second Polish Republic, Daleszyce remained a poor village, without industry, and located away from railroads. Unemployment was common, and jobs scarce in the overpopulated region. In 1932, street fighting erupted after a police officer killed a local resident.

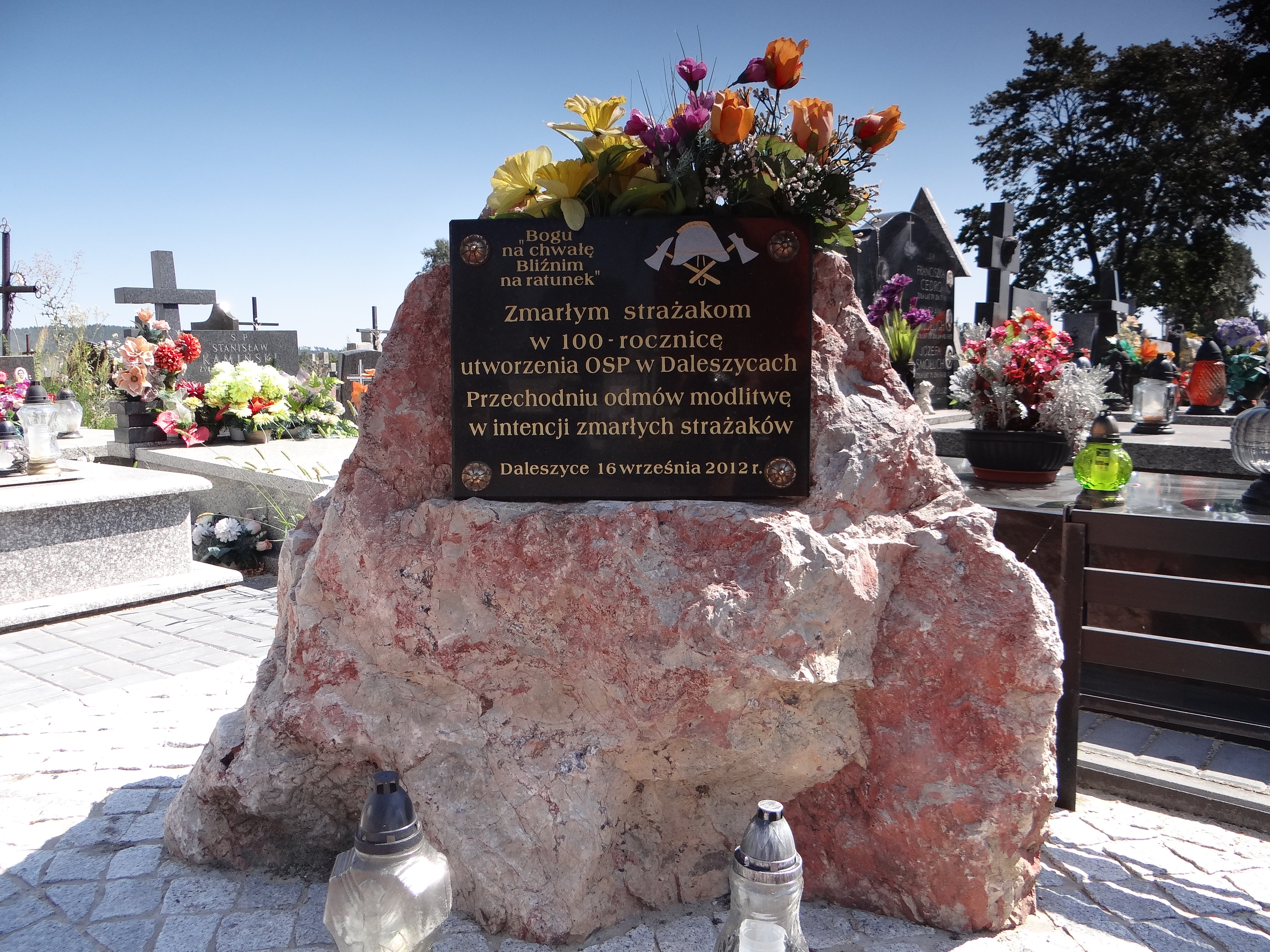
Memorial honoring the centenary of the establishment of the fire department

On September 5, 1939, during the German invasion of Poland, which started World War II, first Wehrmacht units entered Daleszyce, burning 20% of houses. During the Holocaust, almost all Jews were murdered by Germans, and the occupiers executed a number of Poles, including whole families. There are multiple known instances of local Poles who were captured by the Germans for rescuing Jews and sent to prisons and forced labour camps in other locations. One of the captured Poles escaped from the Germans in 1943 in Kielce. In addition, the Germans imposed contributions on the settlement for helping Jews.

During World War II, Daleszyce was an important center of Polish resistance. Local Home Army platoon was part of Kielce’s 4th Home Army Legions Infantry Regiment. Its members took an oath at Daleszyce’s market square (August 9, 1944), singing Polish anthem together with residents. After the oath, Home Army units headed towards Warsaw, to help in Warsaw Uprising, but were halted by the Wehrmacht. On August 26, 1944, whole village was burned to the ground by the Germans and their Ukrainian collaborators, while residents ran away to the forests.

Daleszyce was rebuilt in the late 1940s. Town rights were restored on January 1, 2007.

== Transport ==
The Voivodeship road 764 runs through the town, and the National road 74 runs nearby, north of the town.

== Sports ==
The local football team is Spartakus Daleszyce. It competes in the lower leagues.

== Cuisine ==
The officially protected traditional food of Daleszyce and nearby villages is daleszycka szynka z beczki, a local type of smoked ham (as designated by the Ministry of Agriculture and Rural Development of Poland).
