= Brody, Kielce County =

Brody
- Village
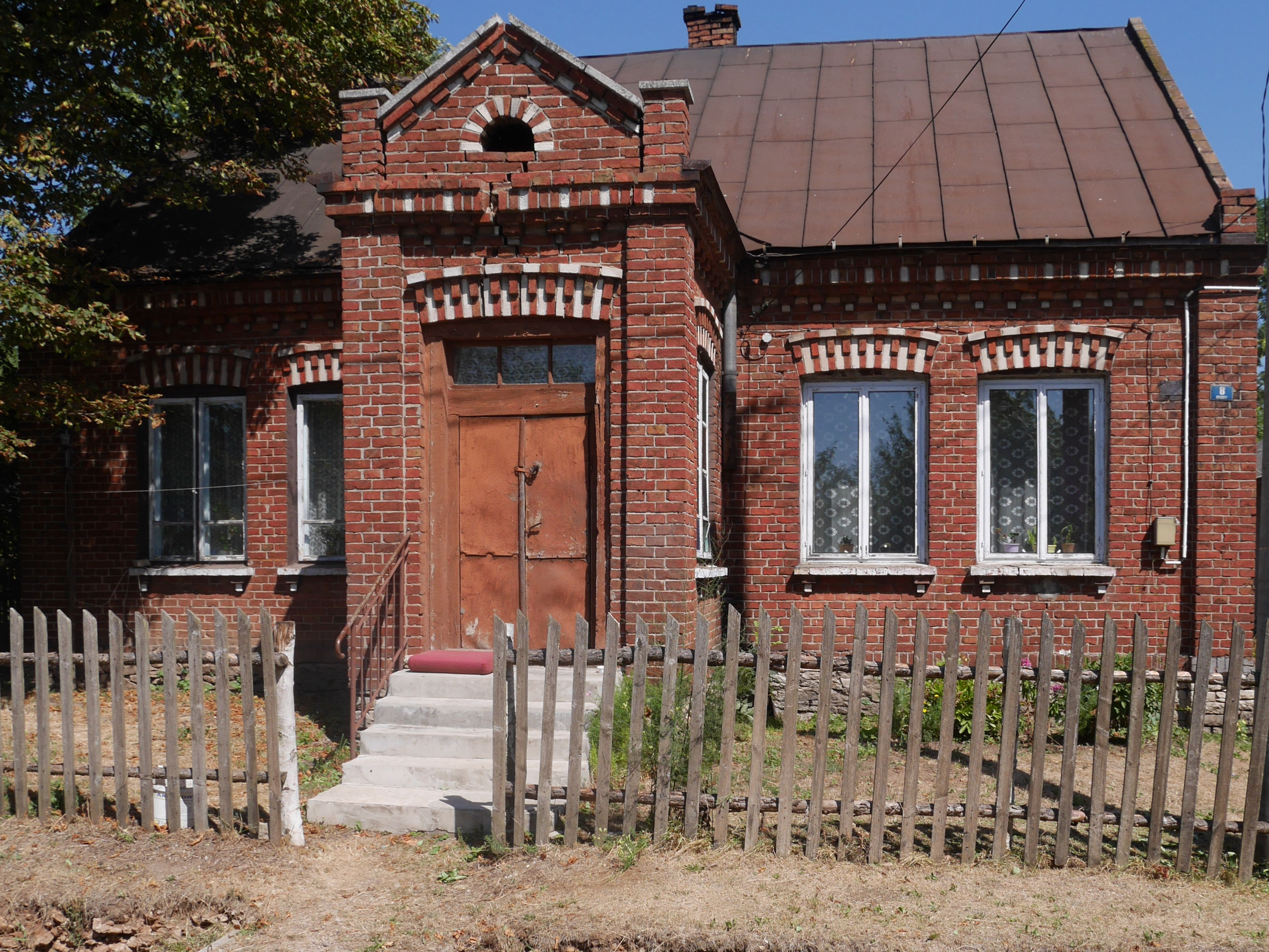

- Location within Poland
- Coordinates: 50°41′7″N 20°41′22″E
- Country: Poland
- Voivodeship: Świętokrzyskie
- County: Kielce
- Gmina: Pierzchnica
- Population: 180

Brody [ˈbrɔdɨ] is a village in the administrative district of Gmina Pierzchnica, within Kielce County, Świętokrzyskie Voivodeship, in south-central Poland. It lies approximately 5 km (3 mi) west of Pierzchnica and 23 km (14 mi) south of the regional capital Kielce.
