= Górki, Kielce County =

Górki
- Village
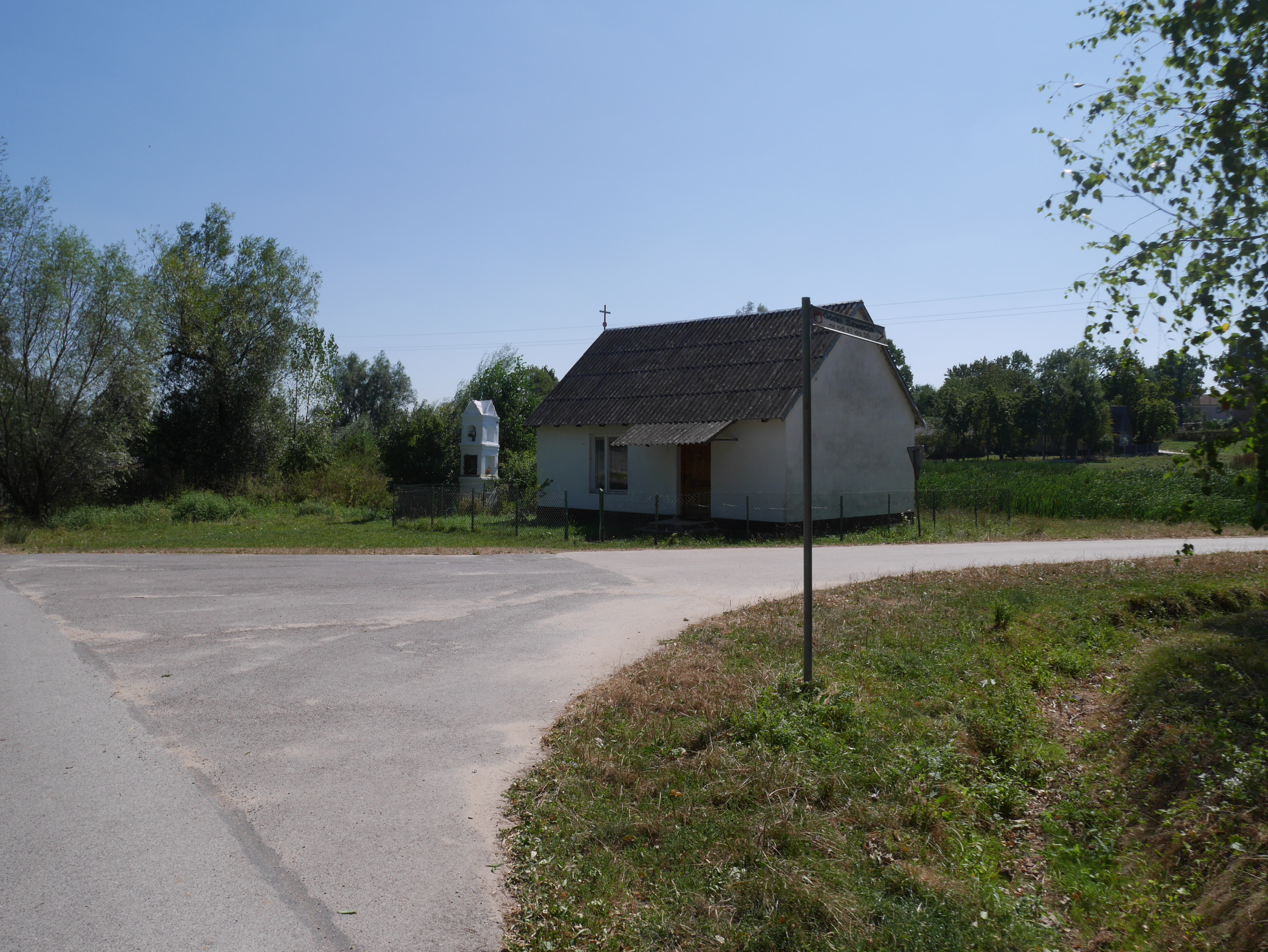

- Location within Poland
- Coordinates: 50°41′57″N 20°42′39″E
- Country: Poland
- Voivodeship: Świętokrzyskie
- County: Kielce
- Gmina: Pierzchnica
- Population: 220

Górki [ˈɡurki] is a village in the administrative district of Gmina Pierzchnica, within Kielce County, Świętokrzyskie Voivodeship, in south-central Poland. It lies approximately 3 km (2 mi) west of Pierzchnica and 22 km (14 mi) south of the regional capital Kielce.
