= Podlesie, Kielce County =

Podlesie
- Village
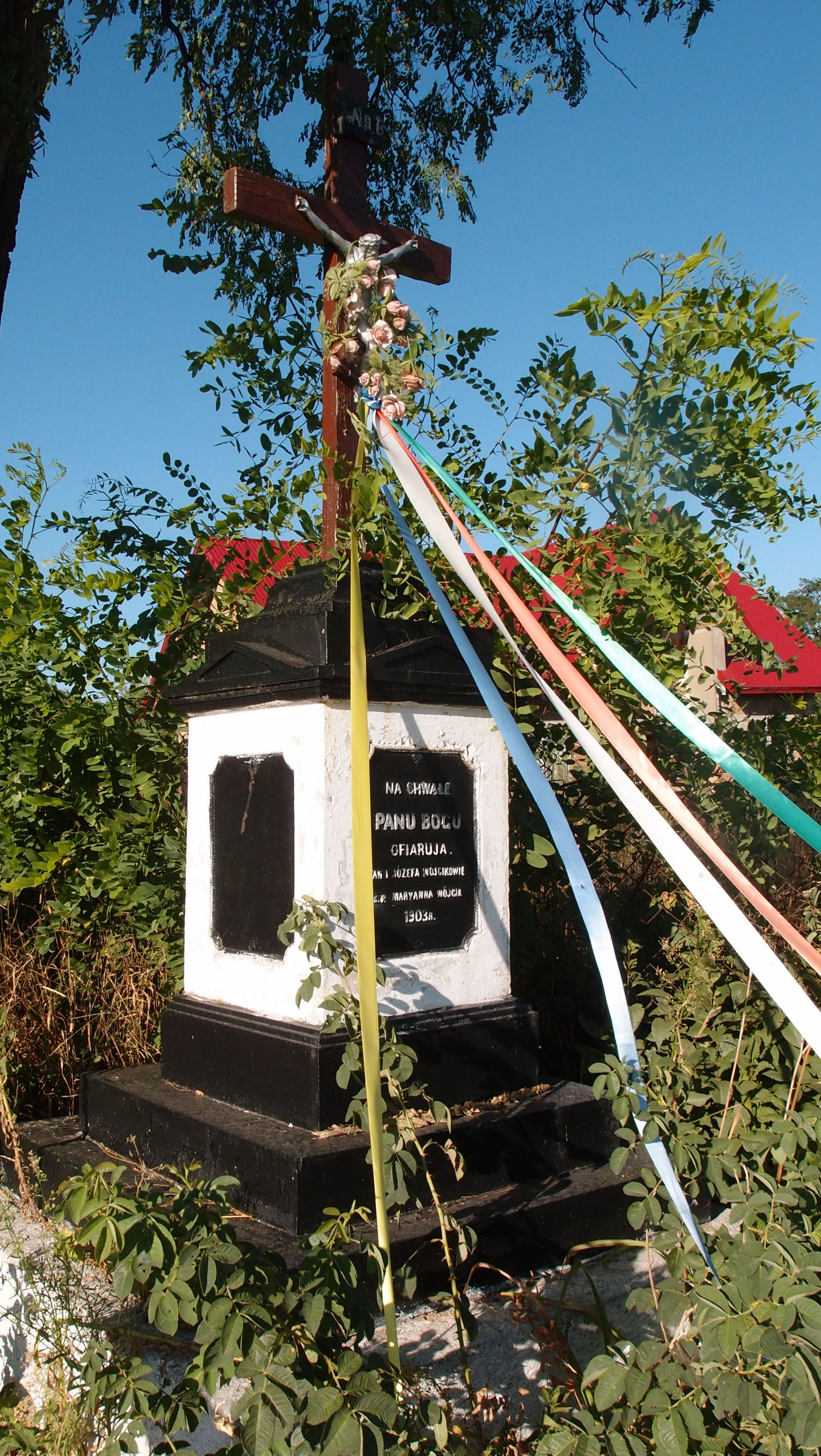
- Roadside cross

- Location within Poland
- Coordinates: 50°39′31″N 20°46′47″E
- Country: Poland
- Voivodeship: Świętokrzyskie
- County: Kielce
- Gmina: Pierzchnica
- Population: 280

Podlesie [pɔdˈlɛɕɛ] is a village in the administrative district of Gmina Pierzchnica, within Kielce County, Świętokrzyskie Voivodeship, in south-central Poland. It lies approximately 5 km (3 mi) south-east of Pierzchnica and 28 km (17 mi) south-east of the regional capital Kielce.
