= Osiny, Kielce County =

Osiny
- Village
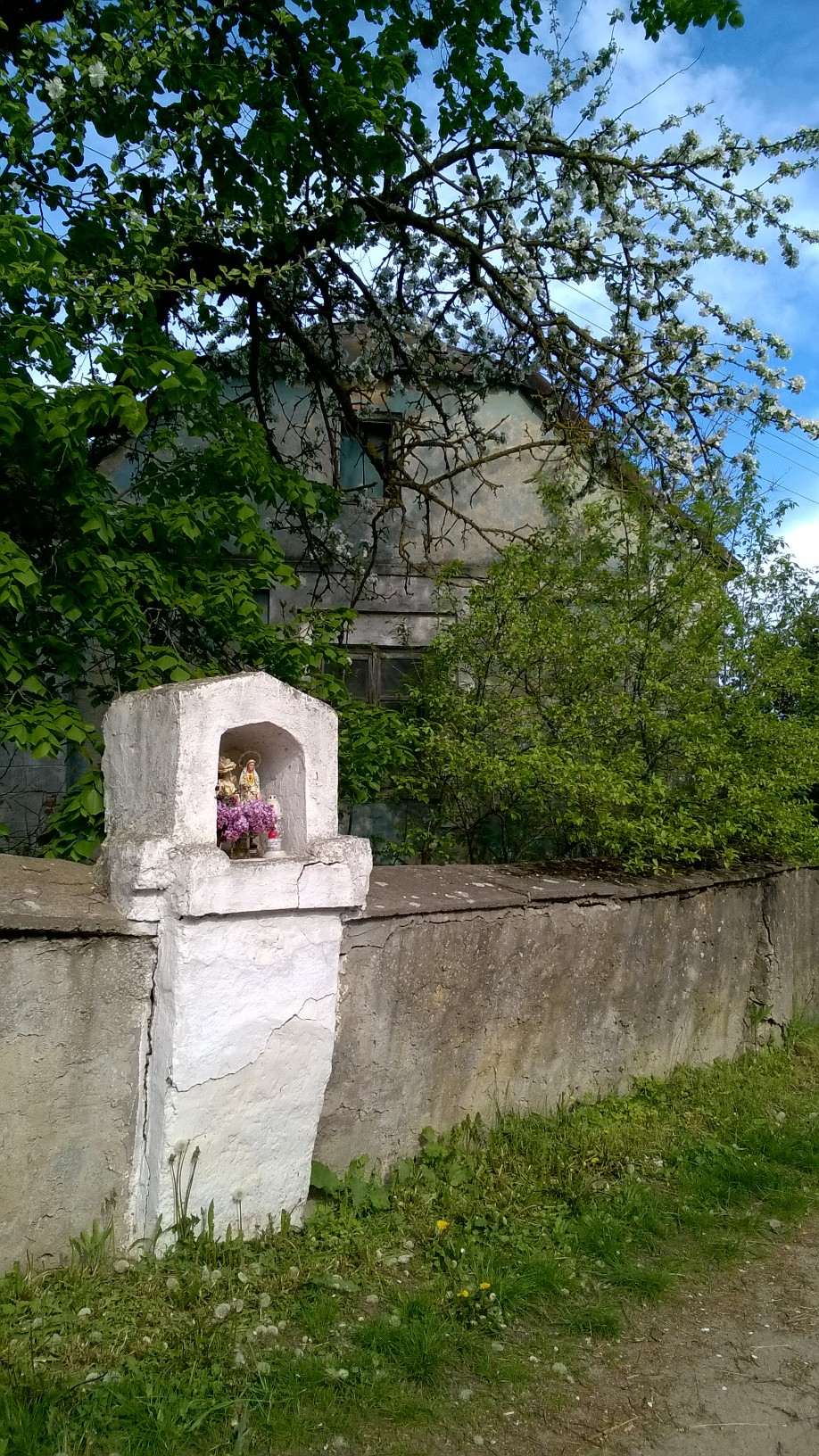
- Roadside shrine

- Location within Poland
- Coordinates: 50°41′29″N 20°47′56″E
- Country: Poland
- Voivodeship: Świętokrzyskie
- County: Kielce
- Gmina: Pierzchnica
- Population: 280

Osiny [ɔˈɕinɨ] is a village in the administrative district of Gmina Pierzchnica, within Kielce County, Świętokrzyskie Voivodeship, in south-central Poland. It lies approximately 4 km (2 mi) east of Pierzchnica and 25 km (16 mi) south-east of the regional capital Kielce.
