= Podstoła, Świętokrzyskie Voivodeship =

Podstoła
- Village
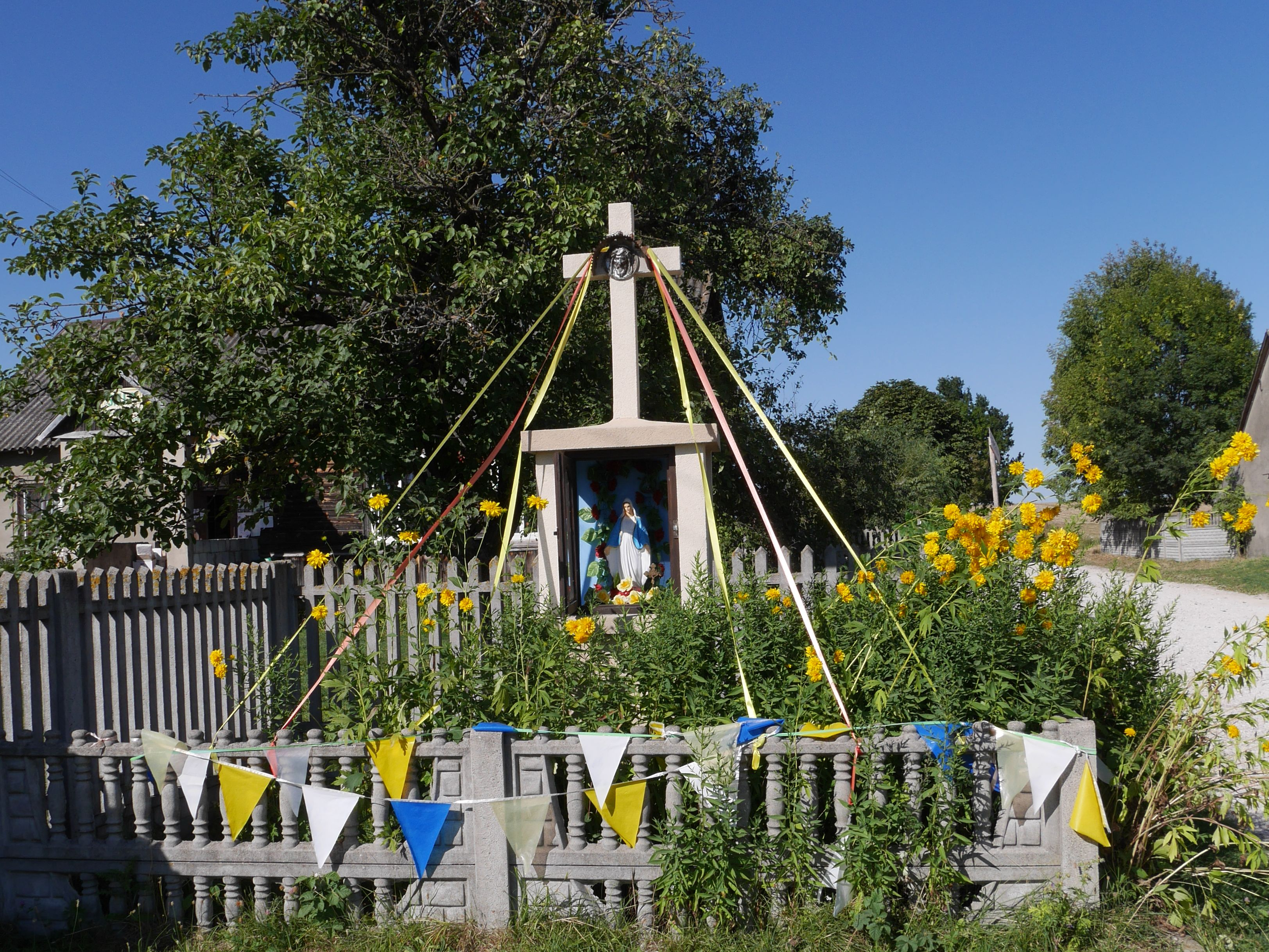
- Wayside cross

- Location within Poland
- Coordinates: 50°40′32″N 20°50′50″E
- Country: Poland
- Voivodeship: Świętokrzyskie
- County: Kielce
- Gmina: Pierzchnica
- Population: 200

Podstoła [pɔtsˈtɔwa] is a village in the administrative district of Gmina Pierzchnica, within Kielce County, Świętokrzyskie Voivodeship, in south-central Poland. It lies approximately 8 km (5 mi) east of Pierzchnica and 29 km (18 mi) south-east of the regional capital Kielce.
