= Drugnia =

- Village
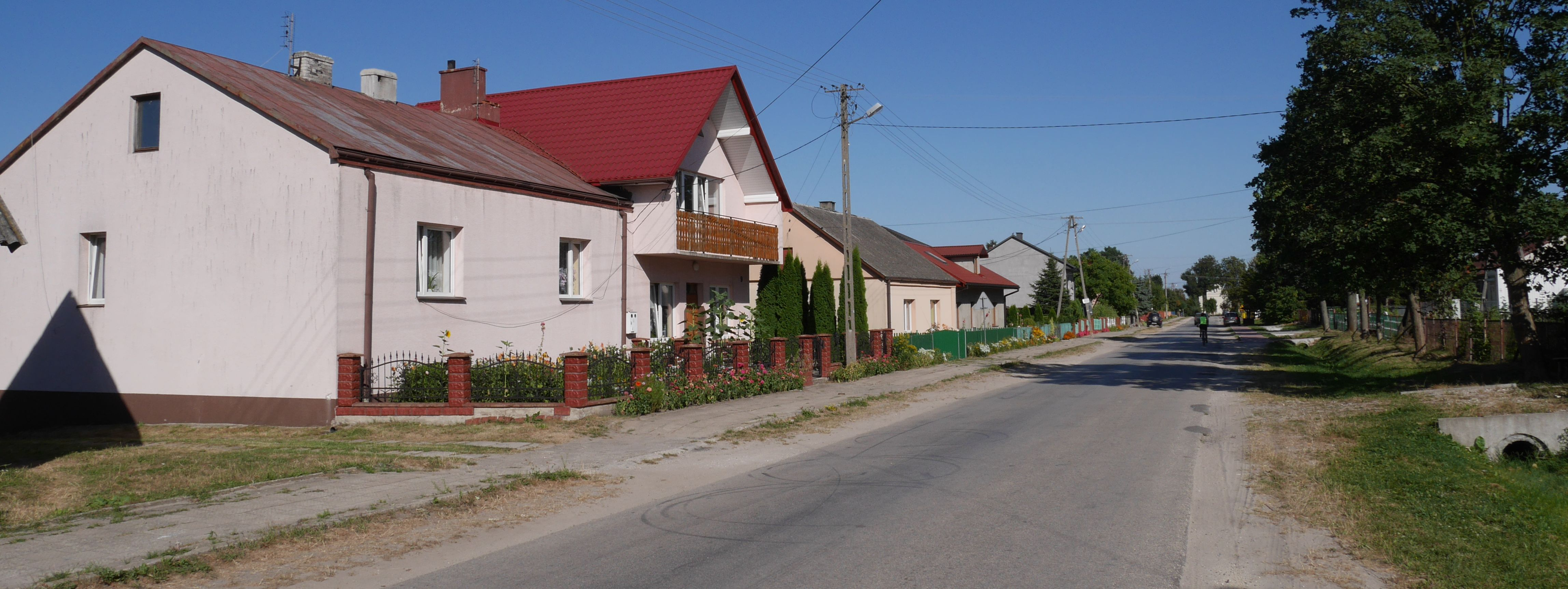

- Location within Poland
- Coordinates: 50°39′24″N 20°50′11″E
- Country: Poland
- Voivodeship: Świętokrzyskie
- County: Kielce
- Gmina: Pierzchnica
- Population: 310

Drugnia [ˈdruɡɲa] is a village in the administrative district of Gmina Pierzchnica, within Kielce County, Świętokrzyskie Voivodeship, in south-central Poland. It lies approximately 8 km (5 mi) south-east of Pierzchnica and 30 km (19 mi) south-east of the regional capital Kielce.
