= Drugnia Rządowa =

- Village
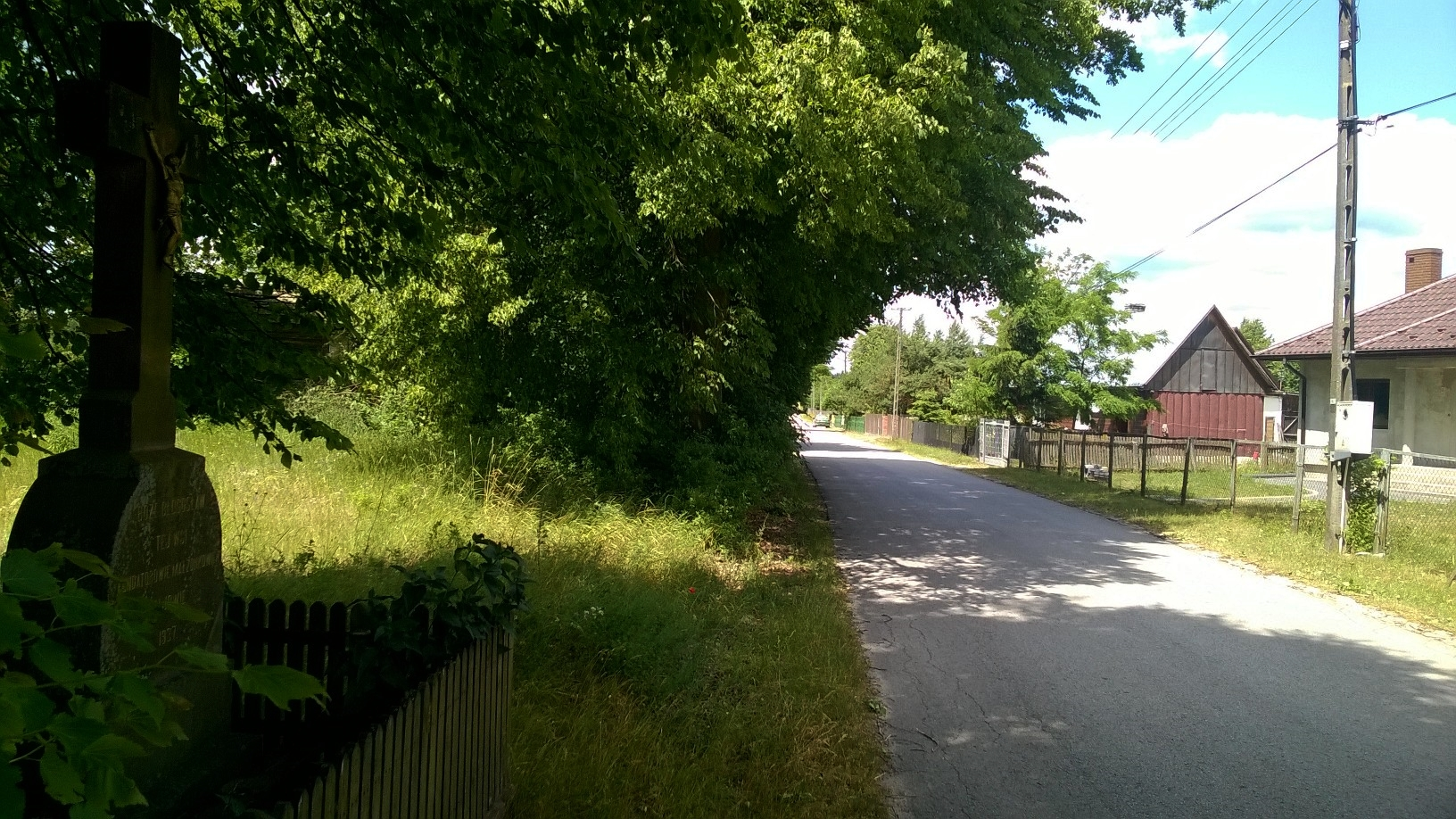

- Location within Poland
- Coordinates: 50°40′8″N 20°49′45″E
- Country: Poland
- Voivodeship: Świętokrzyskie
- County: Kielce
- Gmina: Pierzchnica
- Population: 190

Drugnia Rządowa [ˈdruɡɲa ʐɔnˈdɔva] is a village in the administrative district of Gmina Pierzchnica, within Kielce County, Świętokrzyskie Voivodeship, in south-central Poland. It lies approximately 7 km (4 mi) south-east of Pierzchnica and 29 km (18 mi) south-east of the regional capital Kielce.
