= Gumienice, Świętokrzyskie Voivodeship =

Gumienice
- Village
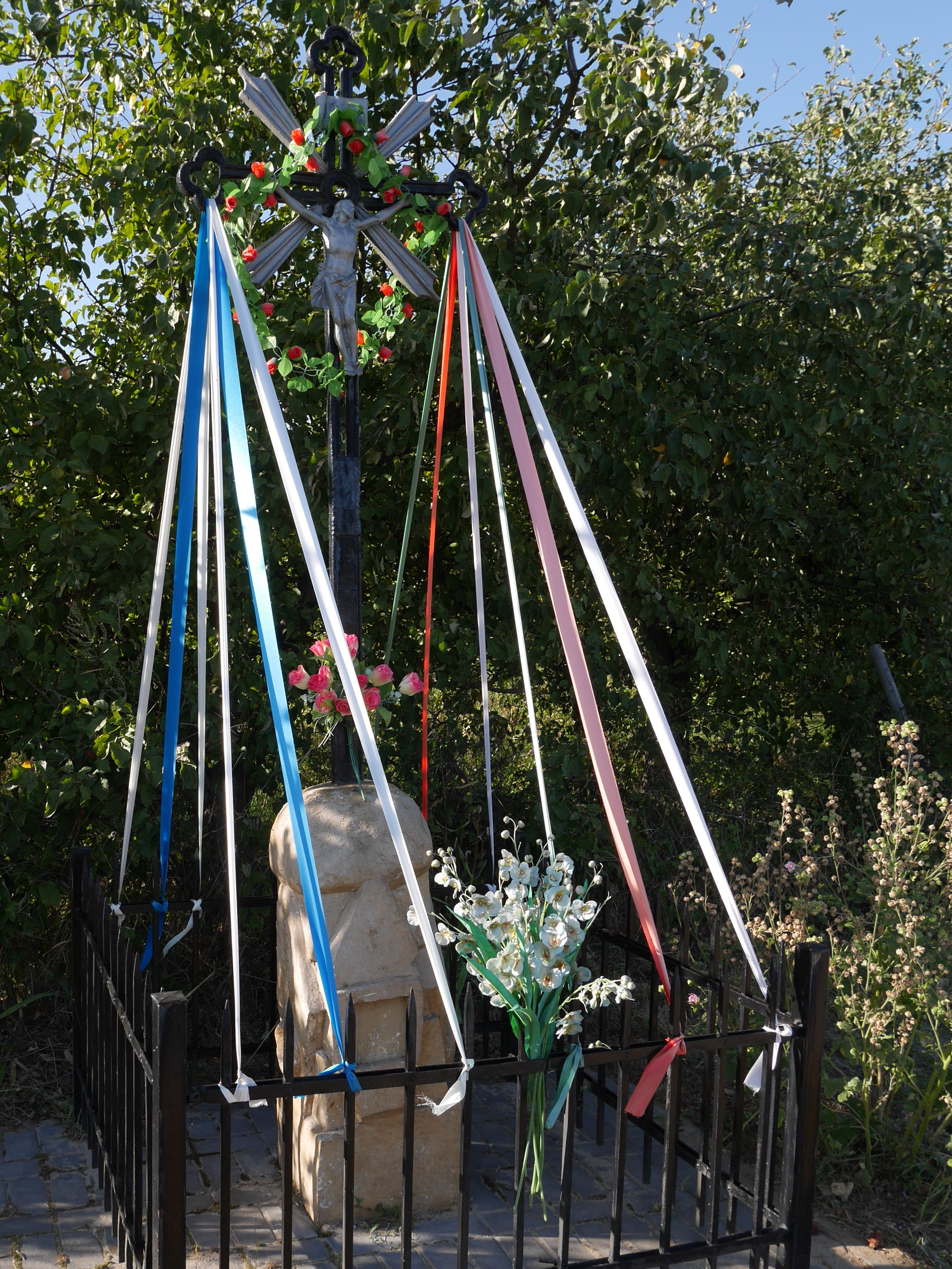
- Wayside cross

- Location within Poland
- Coordinates: 50°40′50″N 20°46′6″E
- Country: Poland
- Voivodeship: Świętokrzyskie
- County: Kielce
- Gmina: Pierzchnica
- Population: 510

Gumienice [ɡumjɛˈnit͡sɛ] is a village in the administrative district of Gmina Pierzchnica, within Kielce County, Świętokrzyskie Voivodeship, in south-central Poland. It lies approximately 3 km (2 mi) south-east of Pierzchnica and 25 km (16 mi) south-east of the regional capital Kielce.
