= Skrzelczyce =

- Village
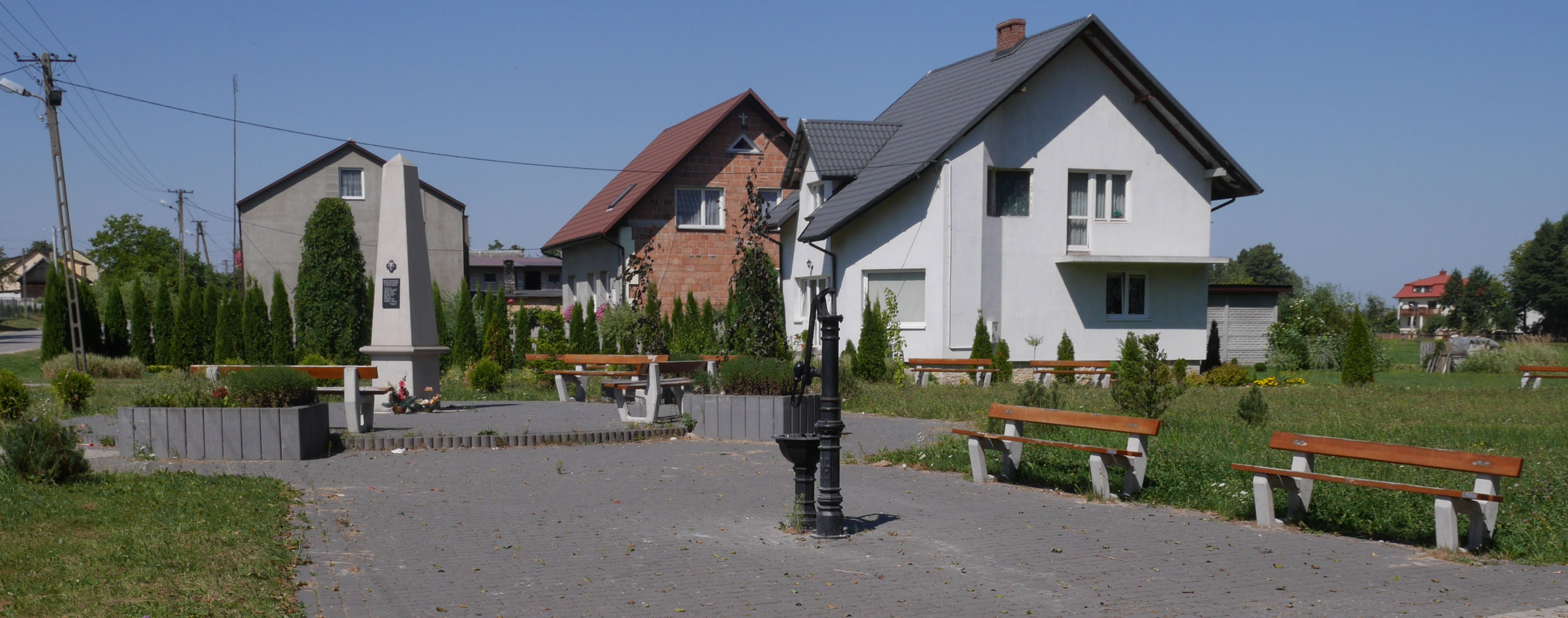

- Location within Poland
- Coordinates: 50°42′55″N 20°43′5″E
- Country: Poland
- Voivodeship: Świętokrzyskie
- County: Kielce
- Gmina: Pierzchnica
- Population: 870

Skrzelczyce [skʂɛlˈt͡ʂɨt͡sɛ] is a village in the administrative district of Gmina Pierzchnica, within Kielce County, Świętokrzyskie Voivodeship, in south-central Poland. It lies approximately 4 km (2 mi) north-west of Pierzchnica and 20 km (12 mi) south of the regional capital Kielce.
