= Czarna, Kielce County =

Czarna
- Village
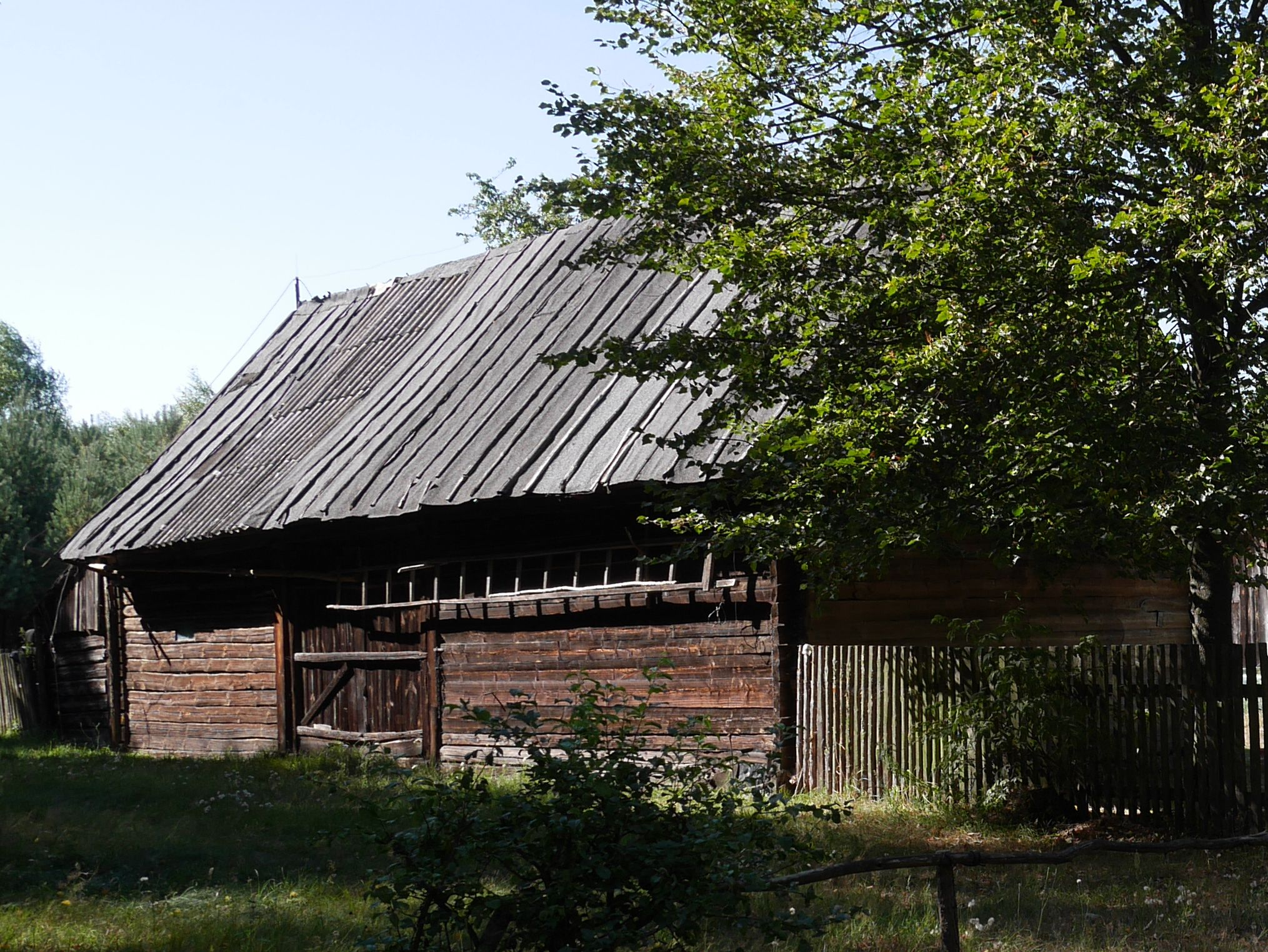

- Location within Poland
- Coordinates: 50°42′13″N 20°51′51″E
- Country: Poland
- Voivodeship: Świętokrzyskie
- County: Kielce
- Gmina: Pierzchnica
- Population: 40

Czarna [ˈt͡ʂarna] is a village in the administrative district of Gmina Pierzchnica, within Kielce County, Świętokrzyskie Voivodeship, in south-central Poland. It lies approximately 8 km (5 mi) east of Pierzchnica and 27 km (17 mi) south-east of the regional capital Kielce.
