= Ujny =

- Village
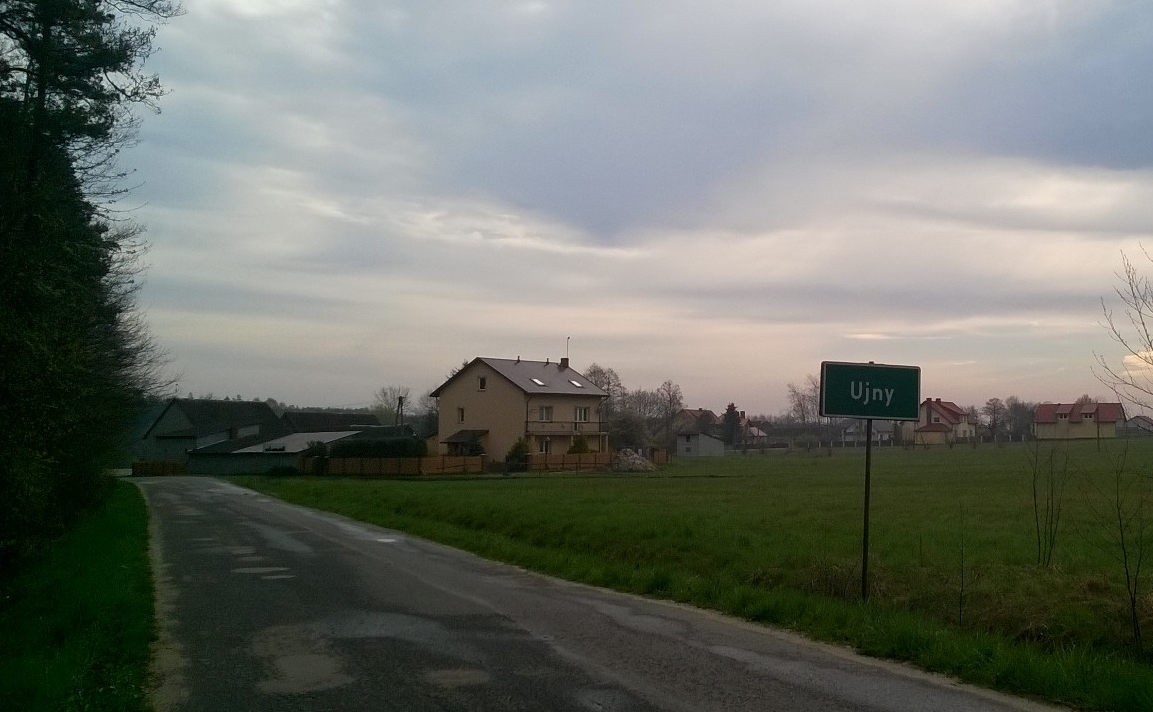

- Location within Poland
- Coordinates: 50°42′49″N 20°49′14″E
- Country: Poland
- Voivodeship: Świętokrzyskie
- County: Kielce
- Gmina: Pierzchnica
- Population: 180

Ujny [ˈui̯nɨ] is a village in the administrative district of Gmina Pierzchnica, within Kielce County, Świętokrzyskie Voivodeship, in south-central Poland. It lies approximately 6 km (4 mi) east of Pierzchnica and 24 km (15 mi) south-east of the regional capital Kielce.
