= Holendry, Gmina Pierzchnica =

Holendry
- Village
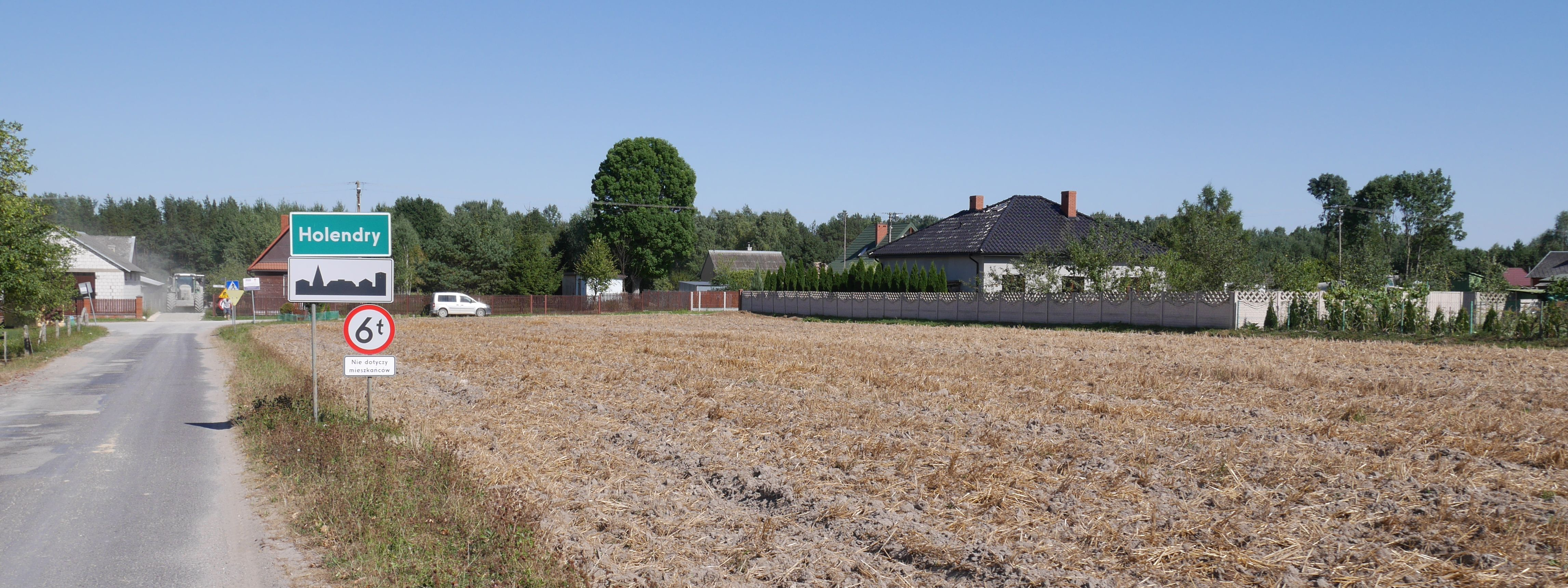

- Location within Poland
- Coordinates: 50°42′46″N 20°51′11″E
- Country: Poland
- Voivodeship: Świętokrzyskie
- County: Kielce
- Gmina: Pierzchnica
- Population: 80

Holendry [xɔˈlɛndrɨ] is a village in the administrative district of Gmina Pierzchnica, within Kielce County, Świętokrzyskie Voivodeship, in south-central Poland. It lies approximately 8 km (5 mi) east of Pierzchnica and 26 km (16 mi) south-east of the regional capital Kielce.
