= Pierzchnianka =

- Village
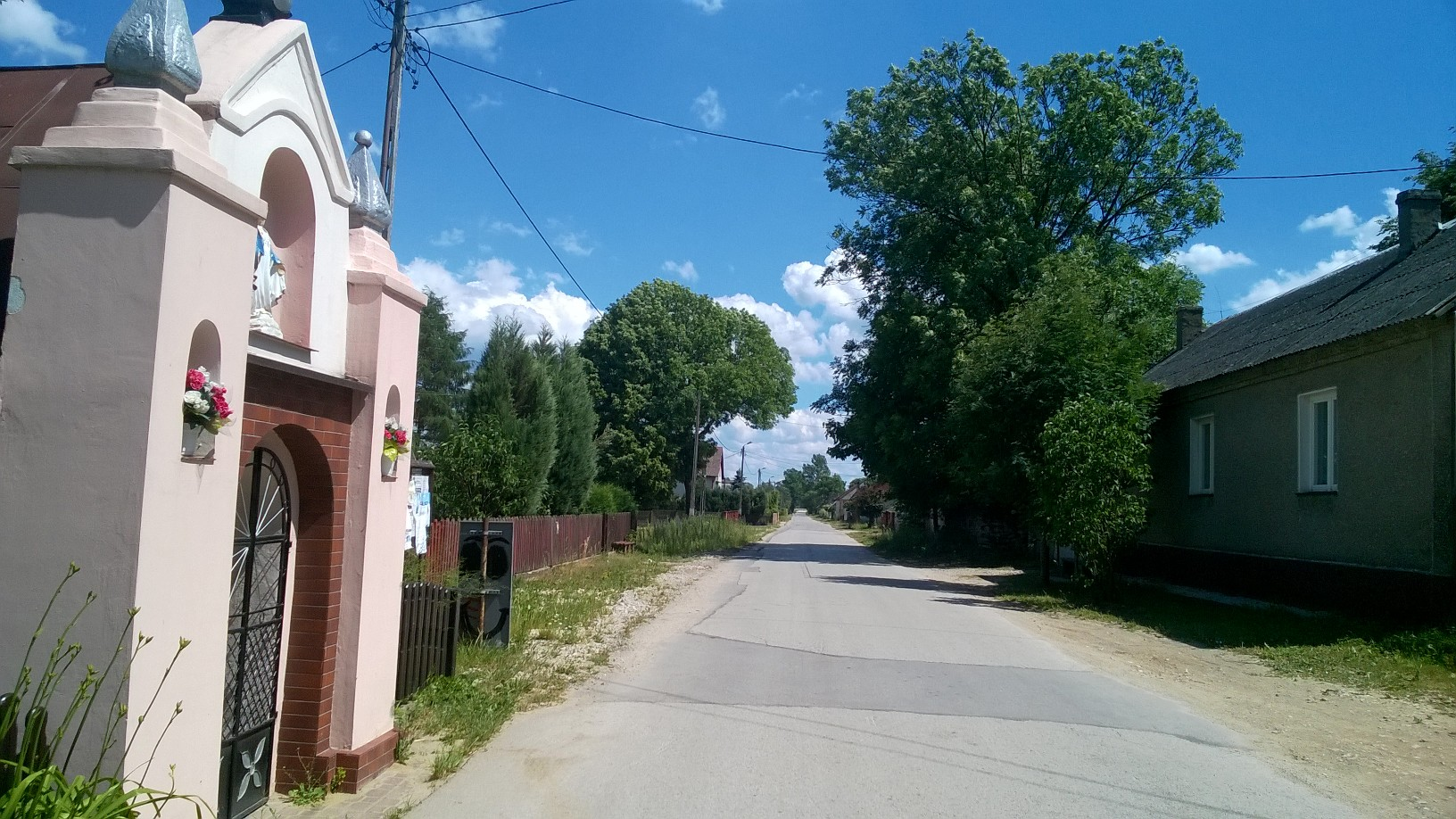

- Location within Poland
- Coordinates: 50°42′9″N 20°46′28″E
- Country: Poland
- Voivodeship: Świętokrzyskie
- County: Kielce
- Gmina: Pierzchnica
- Population: 250

Pierzchnianka [pjɛʂxˈɲaŋka] is a village in the administrative district of Gmina Pierzchnica, within Kielce County, Świętokrzyskie Voivodeship, in south-central Poland. It lies approximately 2 km (1 mi) east of Pierzchnica and 23 km (14 mi) south-east of the regional capital Kielce.
