= Jan Lisiecki =

Canadian pianist (born 1995)

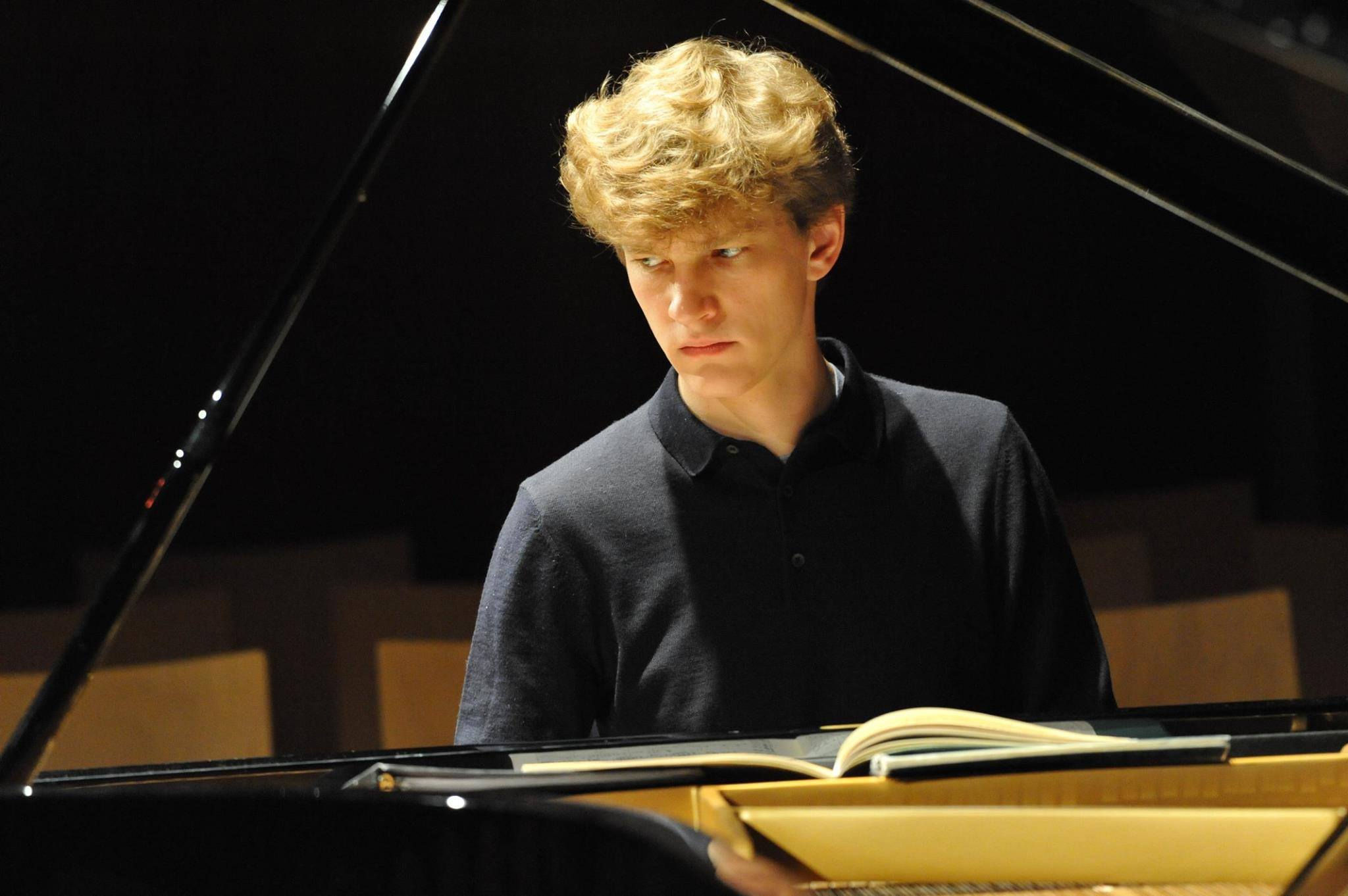
- Lisiecki, 2019

Background information
- Born: Jan Miłosz Lisiecki; March 23, 1995 (age 31); Calgary, Alberta, Canada
- Genres: Classical
- Occupation: Pianist
- Years active: 2004–present
- Label: Deutsche Grammophon/Universal Classics
- Website: www.janlisiecki.com

Jan Lisiecki (/ˈjɑːn lɪˈʃɛtski/; born March 23, 1995) is a Canadian classical pianist. He performs internationally with orchestras and conductors. He has been a recording artist for Deutsche Grammophon since the age of 15. At age 18, Lisiecki was the recipient of Gramophone’s Young Artist Award and the Leonard Bernstein Award.

== Early life and education ==
Lisiecki was born in Calgary, Canada, into a Polish family. He began piano lessons at the age of five and made his orchestral debut at the age of nine. At thirteen, Lisiecki was invited to the 2008 edition of the "Chopin and his Europe" festival in Warsaw, Poland, to perform Chopin's Piano Concerto No. 2, Op. 21 with Sinfonia Varsovia and Howard Shelley. Instantly hailed as the sensation of the festival, he returned in 2009 to perform Chopin's Piano Concerto No. 1, Op. 11 in the same constellation.

He was brought to international attention the following year when the Fryderyk Chopin Institute released the two performances, marking Lisiecki's album debut. The recording was awarded the Diapason d’Or Découverte and met with enthusiastic international reviews, with BBC Music Magazine praising the "sensitively distilled" insights of his Chopin interpretations, and "mature musicality" of his playing, and noting that "even in a crowded CD catalogue, this refreshingly unhyped debut release is one to celebrate". Following the Chopin release, Deutsche Grammophon signed an exclusive contract with Lisiecki that same year, when he was 15 years old.

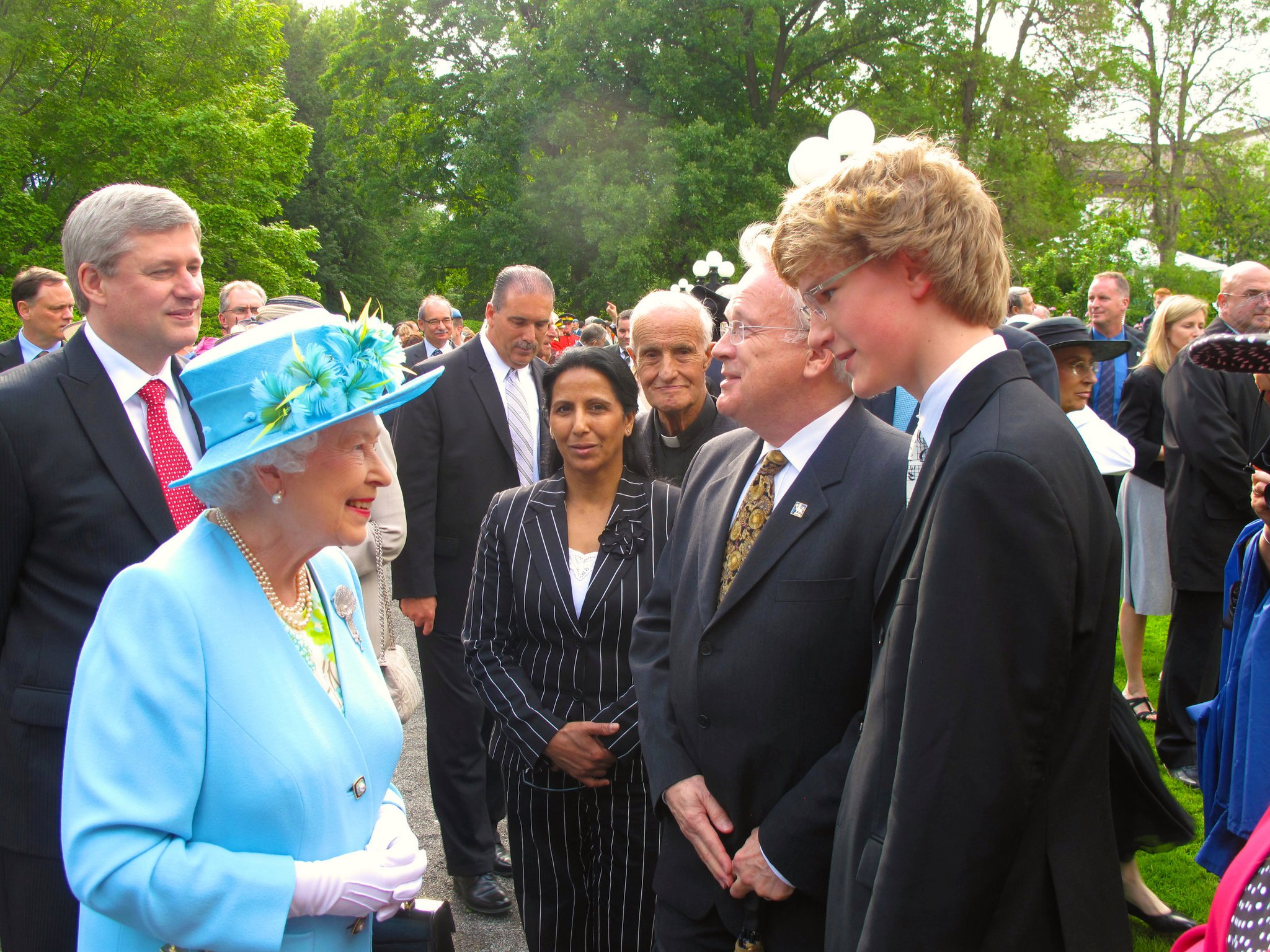
Lisiecki meeting Elizabeth II, Queen of Canada, in Ottawa in 2010

As part of the Canada Day celebrations in 2010, Lisiecki performed for Queen Elizabeth II and an audience of 100,000 people on Parliament Hill in Ottawa, Ontario, Canada.

Lisiecki was accelerated four grades upon the school board's recommendation and graduated in January 2011 from Western Canada High School in Calgary, Alberta, Canada. He completed his undergraduate studies in Toronto at The Glenn Gould School of The Royal Conservatory of Music, where he was admitted on a full scholarship.

== Recordings and critical reception ==
Lisiecki's first recording for Deutsche Grammophon, released in April 2012, features Mozart's Piano Concertos K 466, No. 20, in D minor and K 467, No. 21, in C Major with the Bavarian Radio Symphony Orchestra and Christian Zacharias and was nominated for 2013 Juno Award in the category Classical Album of the Year. It was followed in spring 2013 by Chopin's Études Op. 10 and 25, which Gramophone Magazine described as "played as pure music, given as naturally as breathing".

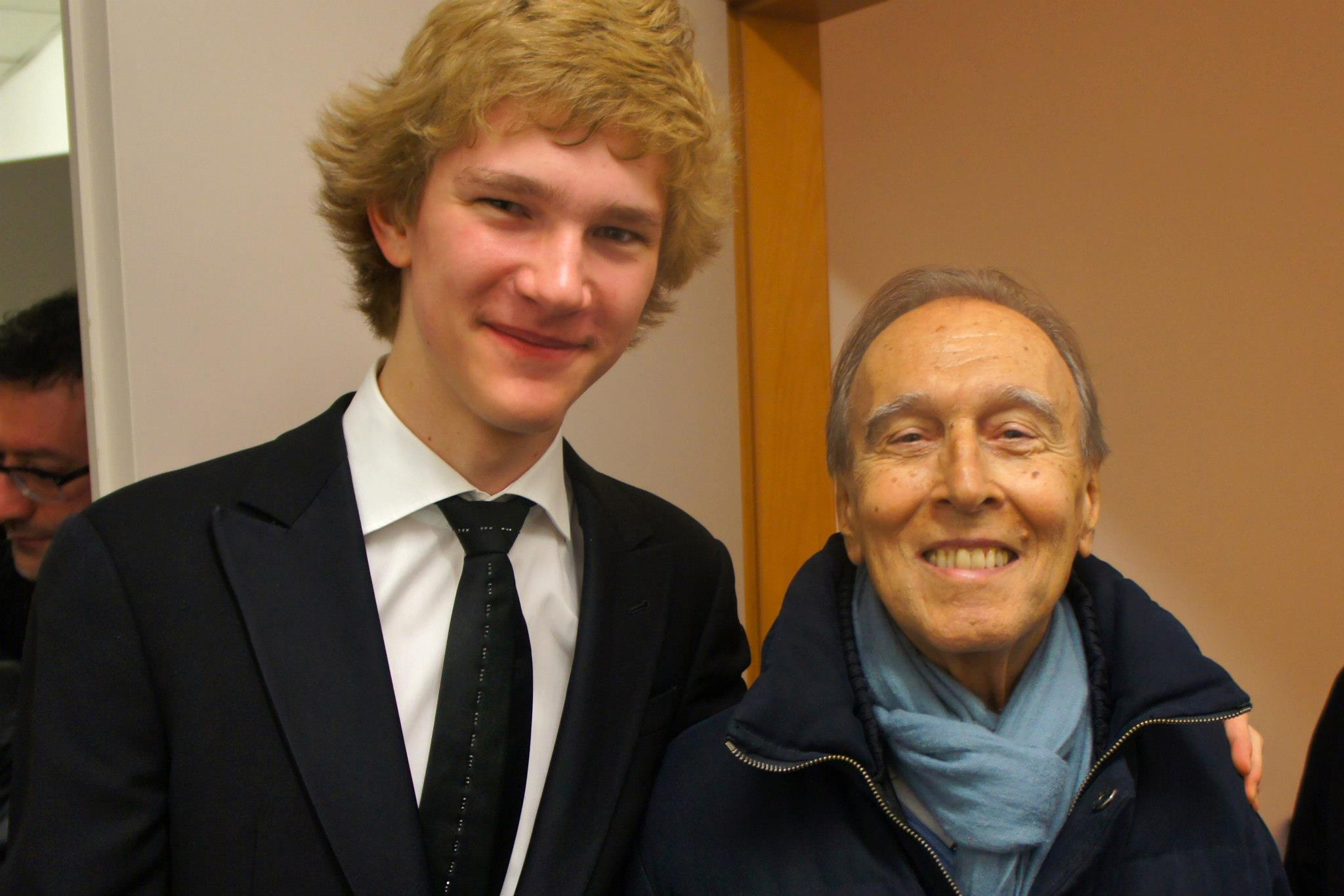
Lisiecki with Claudio Abbado in 2013

In March 2013, Lisiecki substituted at short notice for Martha Argerich, performing Beethoven's Piano Concerto No. 4, Op. 58 in Bologna with the Orchestra Mozart under Claudio Abbado. He concluded the season with a performance of Schumann's Piano Concerto Op. 54 at the BBC Proms in Royal Albert Hall with the Orchestra dell'Accademia Nazionale di Santa Cecilia under Antonio Pappano.

The following year, Lisiecki made his debuts as soloist with world-class orchestras such as the Orchestra Filarmonica della Scala in Milan, Tonhalle Orchester Zurich, NHK Symphony Orchestra in Tokyo, and the Deutsches Symphonie-Orchester Berlin and performed three Mozart concertos in a week with the Philadelphia Orchestra. The same season saw him perform recital debuts at Wigmore Hall, Rome's Accademia Nazionale di Santa Cecilia, and in San Francisco.

In January 2016, Lisiecki played his debut in the Stern auditorium of New York's famed Carnegie Hall at the age of 20, with what the New York Times called an "uncommonly sensitive performance". The same month, Deutsche Grammophon released Lisiecki's recording of Schumann's works for piano and orchestra with Orchestra dell'Accademia Nazionale di Santa Cecilia and Antonio Pappano. ClassicFM wrote, "he may be young but Jan Lisiecki plays Schumann like a legend". Shortly after, he made subscription series debuts with the Cleveland Orchestra, Boston, Pittsburgh and San Francisco Symphony, London Philharmonic Orchestra, Vienna Symphony and Staatskapelle Dresden.

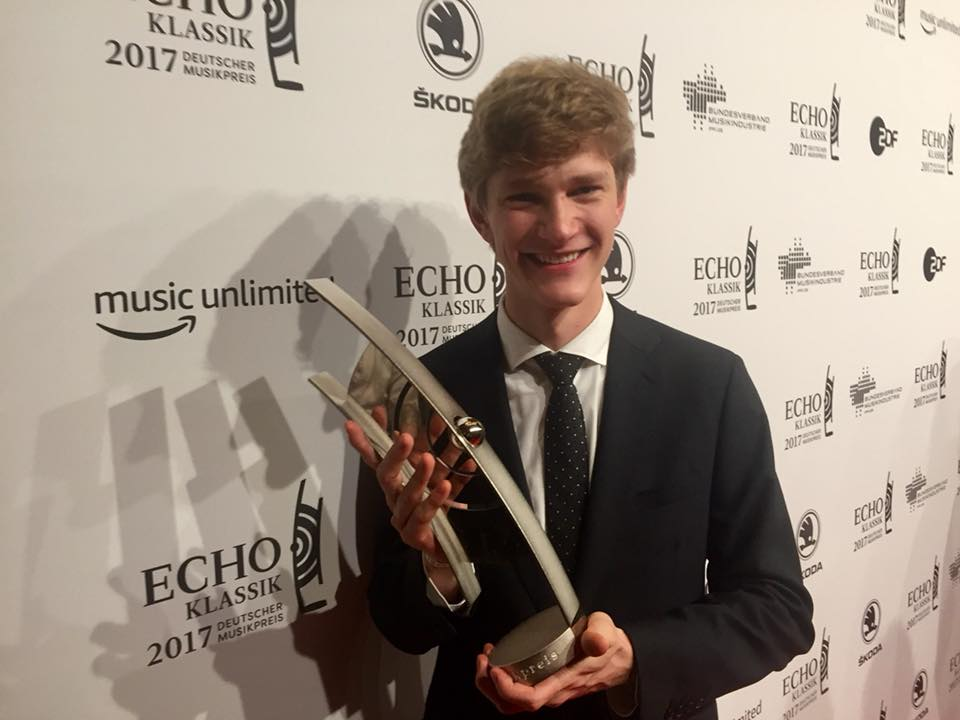
Lisiecki at the 2017 Echo Klassik awards ceremony in Germany

Chopin's rarely performed works for piano and orchestra, recorded with NDR Elbphilharmonie Orchester and Krzysztof Urbański and released in March 2017, was awarded both the Echo Klassik and the Juno Award, respectively Germany's and Canada's most significant recognitions in the music industry.

In August 2018, Lisiecki led the Orpheus Chamber Orchestra from the piano in a performance of Mendelssohn's Piano Concertos No. 1, Op. 25 and No. 2, Op. 40 at the Teatr Wielki in Warsaw, ten years after his first performance and recording at the "Chopin and his Europe" festival. The live recording was released by Deutsche Grammophon in February 2019 and nominated for an OPUS Klassik, the successor award for the discontinued Echo Klassik, and Orpheus and Lisiecki toured the concertos extensively throughout Europe and North America, appearing in Carnegie Hall and Elbphilharmonie.

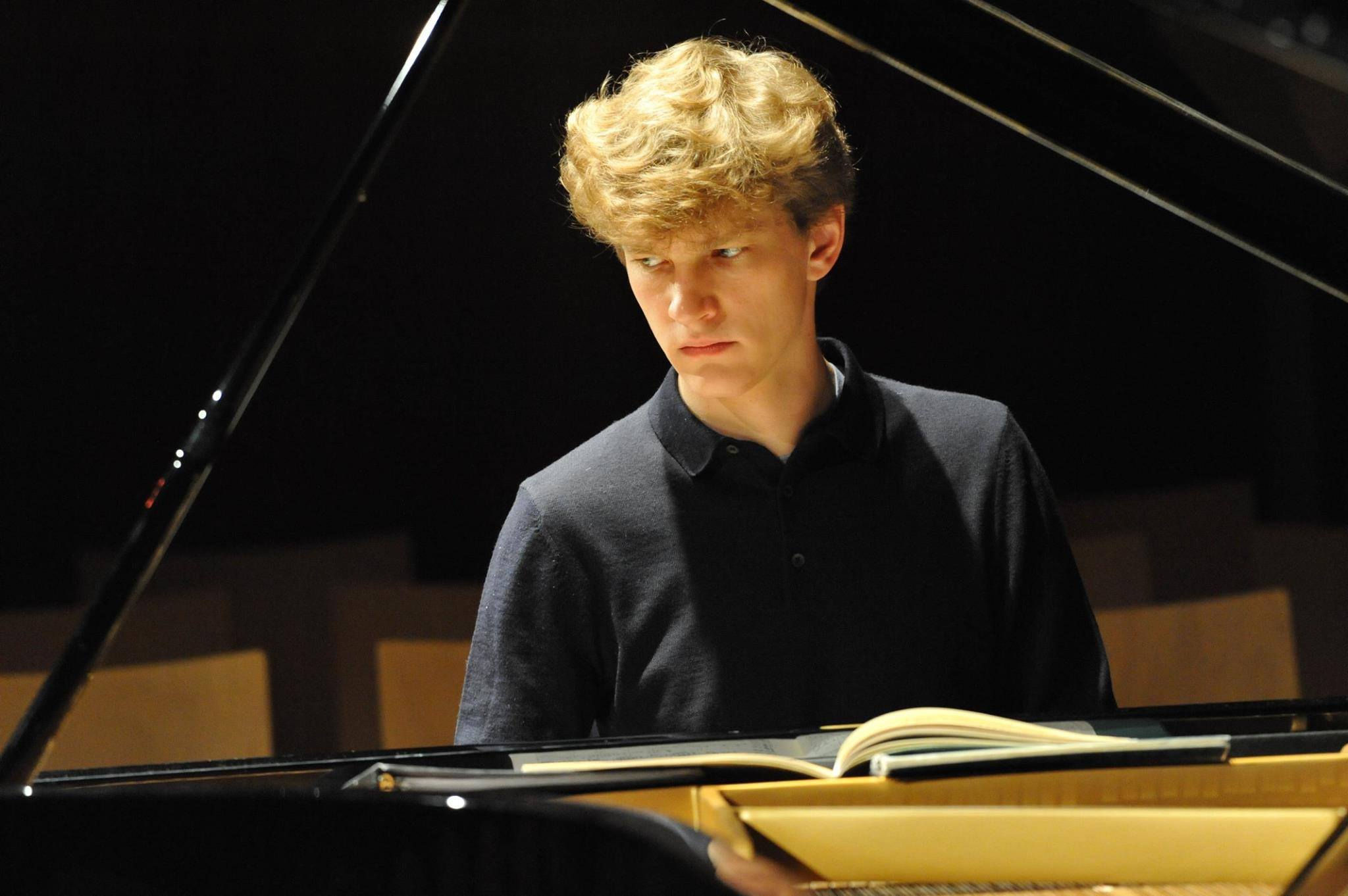
Lisiecki on stage in 2019

In 2018, Lisiecki presented a recital program with works by Chopin, Schumann, Ravel and Rachmaninoff. Titled 'Night Music', it was hailed by reviewers as "intoxicating", "divine" and a "metaphysical sound experience".

His sixth album for Deutsche Grammophon saw him leading the Academy of St Martin in the Fields from the piano for all five Beethoven concertos. The September 2019 release was recorded live in three concerts from Konzerthaus Berlin over the course of five days. It was the first release within the label's celebration of the Beethoven Year 2020, and an audiovisual release followed in January 2020. In March 2020, Deutsche Grammophon released a Beethoven Lieder recording with baritone Matthias Goerne.

The season also saw him perform both a new solo recital programme as well as Lieder recitals with Goerne in Paris, London, Hamburg, Munich and New York City's Lincoln Center, and a series of Beethoven concerto cycles with the Chamber Orchestra of Europe.

Lisiecki has worked with the New York Philharmonic, San Francisco Symphony, Chicago Symphony, Philadelphia Orchestra, Staatskapelle Dresden, Orchestre de Paris, Camerata Salzburg, Munich Philharmonic, BBC Symphony, London Symphony Orchestra, Toronto Symphony Orchestra, National Arts Centre Orchestra, Zürich Chamber Orchestra and Boston Symphony Orchestra, and conductors such as Yannick Nézet-Séguin, Daniel Harding, Michael Tilson Thomas, Manfred Honeck, Andris Nelsons, Tugan Sokhiev and Philippe Jordan.

== Media ==
Radio and television networks worldwide frequently broadcast Lisiecki's performances, and he has been subject to extensive global media coverage, having been featured repeatedly on national television throughout Europe and North America.

In 2009, he was the subject of the 2009 CBC National News documentary by Joe Schlesinger, The Reluctant Prodigy. In 2019, Lisiecki was featured as a protagonist in SchumannVR, a virtual reality installation about the life of Robert and Clara Schumann, supported by the Tonhalle Düsseldorf.

== Activism and charitable deeds ==
Lisiecki is involved in charity work, donating time and performances to such organizations as the David Foster Foundation, the Polish Humanitarian Action and the Make-A-Wish Foundation. He was appointed UNICEF Ambassador to Canada in 2012, having been a National Youth Representative since 2008.

== Discography ==
Title	Album details	Peak positions
Title	Album details	US Classical
Chopin: Piano Concertos No. 1 and No. 2	Participants: Jan Lisiecki, Sinfonia Varsovia, Howard Shelley (conductor); Release: 2010; Gold Award, Polish Society of the Phonographic Industry	—
Mozart: Piano Concertos K 466, No. 20, in D minor and K 467, No. 21, in C Major	Participants: Jan Lisiecki, Bavarian Radio Symphony Orchestra, Christian Zacharias (conductor); Release: 2012	—
Chopin: Études	Participants: Jan Lisiecki; Release: 2013	—
Schumann: Piano Concerto and Concert Pieces Op. 92 & 134	Participants: Jan Lisiecki, Orchestra dell'Accademia Nazionale di Santa Cecilia, Antonio Pappano (conductor); Release: 2016	19
Chopin: Works for Piano and Orchestra	Participants: Jan Lisiecki, NDR Elbphilharmonie Orchester, Krzysztof Urbański (conductor); Release: 2017	13
Mendelssohn	Participants: Jan Lisiecki, Orpheus Chamber Orchestra; Release: 2019	—
Beethoven: Complete Piano Concertos	Participants: Jan Lisiecki, Academy of St Martin in the Fields; Release: 2019	—
Beethoven: Lieder · Songs	Participants: Jan Lisiecki, Matthias Goerne; Release: 2020	—
Chopin: Complete Nocturnes	Participants: Jan Lisiecki; Release: 2021	—
Preludes by Chopin, Bach, Rachmaninoff, Messiaen, Górecki	Participants: Jan Lisiecki; Release: 2025	—

== Awards ==
- 2008 Grand Award, Canadian Music Competition
- 2008 Grand Award, Canadian Music Festival (youngest in history)
- 2009 Grand Prize, OSM Standard Life Competition (youngest in history)
- 2010 Diapason d'Or Découverte Award
- 2010 Gold Award, Polish Society of the Phonographic Industry
- 2010 Révelation Radio-Canada Music
- 2011 Young Artist of Public Francophone Radios
- 2012 UNICEF Ambassador to Canada
- 2013 Juno Nominee, Classical Album of the Year: Large Ensemble or Soloist(s) With Large Ensemble Accompaniment
- 2013 Gramophone Magazine, Editor's Choice (Chopin: Études)
- 2013 Gramophone Young Artist of the Year, Gramophone Magazine (youngest in history)
- 2013 Leonard Bernstein Award, Schleswig-Holstein Musik Festival
- 2013 Canadian Chopin Society, Artist Recognition Award
- 2014 Juno Nominee, Classical Album of the Year: Solo or Chamber Ensemble (Chopin: Études)
- 2017 Echo Klassik, Concerto Recording of the Year (19th Century) (Chopin: Works for Piano and Orchestra)
- 2017 Gramophone Magazine, Critics' Choice (Chopin: Works for Piano and Orchestra)
- 2017 Juno Nominee, Classical Album of the Year: Large Ensemble or Soloist(s) with Large Ensemble Accompaniment (Schumann: Piano Concerto and Concert Pieces Op. 92 & 134)
- 2018 Juno Award, Classical Album of the Year: Large Ensemble or Soloist(s) with Large Ensemble Accompaniment (Chopin: Works for Piano and Orchestra)
- 2019 Gramophone Magazine, Editor's Choice (Mendelssohn)
- 2019 Opus Klassik Nominee, Concerto Recording of the Year (Mendelssohn)
- 2020 Juno Nominee, Classical Album of the Year: Large Ensemble or Soloist(s) with Large Ensemble Accompaniment (Beethoven: Complete Piano Concertos)
- 2020 Diapason d'Or (Beethoven: Lieder · Songs)
- 2020 Opus Klassik Nominee, Instrumentalist of the Year, Concerto Recording of the Year, Audiovisual Music Production of the Year (Beethoven: Complete Piano Concertos and Beethoven: Lieder · Songs)
