= Gmina Pierzchnica =

Gmina Pierzchnica Pierzchnica Commune
- Gmina
- Coat of arms
- Interactive map of Gmina Pierzchnica
- Coordinates (Pierzchnica): 50°41′50″N 20°45′11″E
- Country: Poland
- Voivodeship: Świętokrzyskie
- County: Kielce County
- Seat: Pierzchnica

Area
  - Total: 104.59 km^{2} (40.38 sq mi)

Population (2006)
  - Total: 4,778
  - Density: 45.68/km^{2} (118.3/sq mi)
- Website: http://www.pierzchnica.pl

Gmina Pierzchnica is a rural gmina (administrative district) in Kielce County, Świętokrzyskie Voivodeship, in south-central Poland. Its seat is the village of Pierzchnica, which lies approximately 23 kilometres (14 mi) south-east of the regional capital Kielce.

The gmina covers an area of 104.59 square kilometres (40.4 sq mi), and as of 2006 its total population is 4,778.

The gmina contains part of the protected area called Cisów-Orłowiny Landscape Park.

== Villages ==
Gmina Pierzchnica contains the villages and settlements of Brody, Czarna, Drugnia, Drugnia Rządowa, Górki, Gumienice, Holendry, Kalina Górecka, Maleszowa, Osiny, Pierzchnianka, Pierzchnica, Podlesie, Podstoła, Skrzelczyce, Strojnów, Ujny and Wierzbie.

== Neighbouring gminas ==
Gmina Pierzchnica is bordered by the gminas of Chmielnik, Daleszyce, Gnojno, Morawica, Raków and Szydłów.
