= Chopin and his Europe =

International music festival held in Warsaw, Poland

Chopin and his Europe is an international music festival organised in Warsaw since 2005 by the Fryderyk Chopin Institute. It presents European music within the context of its links with the life and work of the Polish composer Fryderyk Chopin.

The project is realised as part of the government programme "Fryderyk Chopin Heritage 2010". It is one of the annual cultural events of the summer in Poland, devised by artistic director Stanisław Leszczyński.

One important strand to the festival programme is historical performances, presenting works as they were originally heard, on period pianos in the possession of the Fryderyk Chopin Institute: an Erard from 1849, a Pleyel from 1846 and a Graf (a copy of an instrument from c. 1819).

The festival is organised in collaboration with the Warsaw Philharmonic, Teatr Wielki – Polish National Opera and Polish Radio II.

Each year, the invited guests include performers from around the world, many of whom have a special connection with the festival, including Martha Argerich, Nelson Freire, Dina Yoffe, Tobias Koch, Ivo Pogorelich, Garrick Ohlsson and Jan Lisiecki. The festival also features performances by finalists and other participants in the Chopin Competition.
