= Gorecki =

Gorecki or Górecki (feminine: Gorecka or Górecka) is a Polish-language surname, also distorted as Goretzki, Goretzka, Gurecki, Gurecka. Belarusian equivalent: Haretski. It may refer to:

== People ==
- Adam Devlin (born as Adam Tadek Gorecki 1969), English musician
- Agnieszka Górecka, Polish biologist and 2019 Ig Nobel Prize winner
- Antoni Gorecki (1787–1861), Polish poet and author
- Emelia Gorecka (born 1994), British runner
- Haley Gorecki (born 1996), American basketball player
- Halina Górecka (born 1938), Polish-German sprinter
- Henryk Górecki (1933–2010), Polish composer
- Kazimierz Górecki (1954–1977), Polish sprint canoer
- Leon Goretzka (born 1995), German footballer
- Maria Kazanecka-Górecka (born 1955), Polish sprint canoer
- Martin Gorecki (1871–1928), American politician
- Mikołaj Górecki (born 1971), Polish composer
- Reid Gorecki (born 1980), American baseball outfielder
- Rick Gorecki (born 1973), American baseball pitcher
- Tadeusz Gorecki (1825–1868), Polish painter
- Viola Goretzki (born 1956), German rower
- Zuzanna Górecka (born 2000), Polish volleyball player; see 2021 Women's European Volleyball Championship squads § Poland

== Other uses ==
- Górecki (song), a 1997 single by Lamb from their debut album Lamb
- Mount Gorecki, a mountain in the Schmidt Hills of the Neptune Range of the Pensacola Mountains, Antarctica
- Kalina Górecka, a village in Świętokrzyskie Voivodeship, in south-central Poland
- Wola Górecka, a village in Podkarpackie Voivodeship, in south-eastern Poland
