= Kalina Górecka =

- Village
- Location within Poland
- Coordinates: 50°41′48″N 20°43′51″E
- Country: Poland
- Voivodeship: Świętokrzyskie
- County: Kielce
- Gmina: Pierzchnica

Kalina Górecka [kaˈlina ɡuˈrɛt͡ska] is a village in the administrative district of Gmina Pierzchnica, within Kielce County, Świętokrzyskie Voivodeship, in south-central Poland. It lies approximately 2 km (1 mi) west of Pierzchnica and 23 km (14 mi) south of the regional capital Kielce.
