= Pierzchnica =

- Town
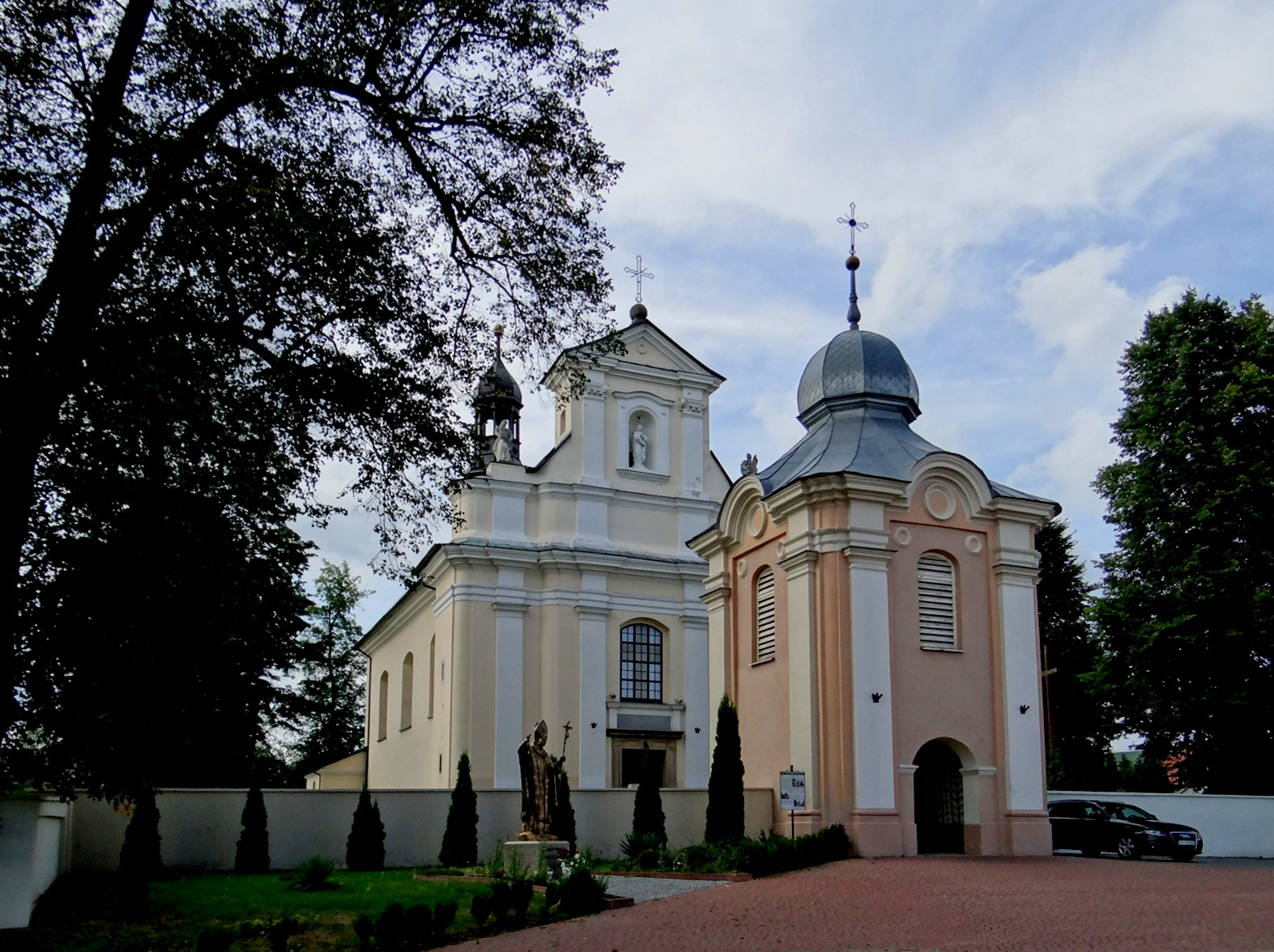
- Saint Margaret church in Pierzchnica

- Coat of arms

- Location within Poland
- Coordinates: 50°41′50″N 20°45′11″E
- Country: Poland
- Voivodeship: Świętokrzyskie
- County: Kielce
- Gmina: Pierzchnica

Population
  - Total: 870
- Time zone: UTC+1 (CET)
  - Summer (DST): UTC+2 (CEST)
- Vehicle registration: TKI

Pierzchnica [pjɛʂxˈnit͡sa] is a town in Kielce County, Świętokrzyskie Voivodeship, in south-central Poland. It is the seat of the gmina (administrative district) of Gmina Pierzchnica. It lies in historic Lesser Poland, approximately 23 km (14 mi) south-east of the regional capital Kielce.

== History ==
In the late Middle Ages, Pierzchnica was a royal village, first mentioned in documents from 1336. It is not known when it was granted a town charter – it happened between 1359 and 1397, during the reign of either Casimir III the Great or Władysław II Jagiełło. The name of the town was spelled as either Pyrzsznycza or Pyersnicza (1579). According to Jan Długosz, the town remained a royal property, with its wooden church. In 1497, King Jan Olbracht allowed Pierzchnica to organize markets on every Tuesday. In 1512, the Magdeburg rights town charter for Pierzchnica was confirmed, after the original document had burned in a fire. It was a royal town of the Kingdom of Poland, administratively located in the Wiślica County in the Sandomierz Voivodeship in the Lesser Poland Province. Nevertheless, Pierzchnica remained a small and poor town, with 50 houses in 1621, much smaller than Szydlow. Furthermore, it was burned to the ground during the Swedish invasion of Poland (1656).

Until the Partitions of Poland, Pierzchnica remained in private hands. In 1789, the town had a wooden town hall, with 70 houses (65 Catholic and 5 Jewish). Following the Third Partition of Poland, it was annexed by Austria. In 1798–1800, the former Voivode of Sandomierz Maciej Sołtyk funded a new, stone church of St. Margaret, which replaced the wooden complex. After the Polish victory in the Austro-Polish War of 1809, the town was regained by Poles and included within the short-lived Duchy of Warsaw, and after its dissolution in 1815 it part of Russian-controlled Congress Poland. In 1827, it had 111 houses and the population of 641, which grew to almost 1,000 by 1862. Its residents actively supported the January Uprising, for which Pierzchnica was stripped of its town charter in 1869.

Following the joint German-Soviet invasion of Poland, which started World War II in September 1939, Pierzchnica was occupied by Germany until 1945.
