= Kudry =

- Village
- Location within Poland
- Coordinates: 51°44′38″N 23°6′38″E
- Country: Poland
- Voivodeship: Lublin
- County: Parczew
- Gmina: Jabłoń

Kudry [ˈkudrɨ] is a village in the administrative district of Gmina Jabłoń, within Parczew County, Lublin Voivodeship, in eastern Poland.
