= Łubno, Lublin Voivodeship =

Łubno
- Village
- Location within Poland
- Coordinates: 51°43′28″N 23°0′36″E
- Country: Poland
- Voivodeship: Lublin
- County: Parczew
- Gmina: Jabłoń

Łubno [ˈwubnɔ] is a village in the administrative district of Gmina Jabłoń, within Parczew County, Lublin Voivodeship, in eastern Poland.
