= Zadębie, Parczew County =

Zadębie
- Village
- Location within Poland
- Coordinates: 51°37′45″N 23°8′39″E
- Country: Poland
- Voivodeship: Lublin
- County: Parczew
- Gmina: Dębowa Kłoda

Zadębie [zaˈdɛmbjɛ] is a village in the administrative district of Gmina Dębowa Kłoda, within Parczew County, Lublin Voivodeship, in eastern Poland.
