= Turno, Lublin Voivodeship =

Turno
- Village
- Location within Poland
- Coordinates: 51°33′N 23°10′E
- Country: Poland
- Voivodeship: Lublin
- County: Parczew
- Gmina: Sosnowica

Turno [ˈturnɔ] is a village in the administrative district of Gmina Sosnowica, within Parczew County, Lublin Voivodeship, in eastern Poland.
