= Siemień-Kolonia =

- Village
- Location within Poland
- Coordinates: 51°38′1″N 22°46′16″E
- Country: Poland
- Voivodeship: Lublin
- County: Parczew
- Gmina: Siemień
- Time zone: UTC+1 (CET)
  - Summer (DST): UTC+2 (CEST)

Siemień-Kolonia [ˈɕɛmjɛɲ kɔˈlɔɲa] is a village in the administrative district of Gmina Siemień, within Parczew County, Lublin Voivodeship, in eastern Poland.

== History ==
11 Polish citizens were murdered by Nazi Germany in the village during World War II.
