= Wólka Siemieńska =

- Village
- Location within Poland
- Coordinates: 51°38′N 22°45′E
- Country: Poland
- Voivodeship: Lublin
- County: Parczew
- Gmina: Siemień

Wólka Siemieńska [ˈvulka ɕɛˈmjɛɲska] is a village in the administrative district of Gmina Siemień, within Parczew County, Lublin Voivodeship, in eastern Poland.
