= Chmielów, Lublin Voivodeship =

Chmielów
- Village
- Location within Poland
- Coordinates: 51°38′16.7″N 23°2′23.7″E
- Country: Poland
- Voivodeship: Lublin
- County: Parczew
- Gmina: Dębowa Kłoda

Chmielów [ˈxmjɛluf] is a village in the administrative district of Gmina Dębowa Kłoda, within Parczew County, Lublin Voivodeship, in eastern Poland.
