= Kazimierz Kwiatkowski (architect) =

Polish architect

- Kwiatkowski at Mỹ Sơn
- Born: 2 July 1944; Pachole, Lublin Voivodeship, General Government (now Poland)
- Died: 19 March 1997 (aged 52); Huế, Vietnam
- Other name: 'Kazik'
- Occupations: Architect, Conservationist
- Spouse: Więcesława Porzadna (m. 1968–1997)
- Children: 3

Kazimierz Kwiatkowski (2 July 1944 – 19 March 1997) was a Polish architect and conservationist. He is well known for his efforts to preserve historical and archaeological sites in Vietnam such as the Imperial City of Huế, Hội An and Mỹ Sơn, which are currently in the World Heritage Site list of UNESCO.

== Early life ==
He was born in 1944 in the town of Pachole at Lublin Voivodeship. He was the only child of his family. His parents were farmers. His father was persecuted due to his opposition to the communist government of Poland and Kwiatkowski grew up without his father until the age of 9, when his father was amnestied in 1953, following the death of Joseph Stalin.

Kwiatkowski had a talent for drawing since childhood. At the age of 15, he entered the boarding school in Zamość and graduated in 1963. After graduation from high school, he then applied to two universities at the same time: the Academy of Arts in Kraków and Kraków Polytechnic University. His admission was confirmed in advance from the Kraków Polytechnic University. Being able to study at this faculty was an extremely rare event for someone from a peasant family like him, so he decided to study architecture at Kraków Polytechnic University.

He graduated with a master's degree in architectural engineering in 1969.

== Career ==
In September 1969, Kwiatkowski worked as an assistant in the Office of Urban Planning at the Lublin Provincial Committee. From March 1972 to October 1974, he worked as a designer at the branch of the State Company - Office of Monuments Restoration (Państwowe Przedsiębiorstwo Pracowni Konserwacji Zabytków - PP PKZ) in Lublin. During this time, he passed the national exam and received a license to practice construction and design.

From mid-November 1974 till the end of November 1979 he worked at the General Construction Research and Design Office “Miastoprojekt” (City Design). As head of the design team, he was in charge of spatial planning as well as urban planning. His first work related to the protection of monuments was investigating ethnic works built in the local area, for the purpose of serving the construction of the Lublin Village Open Air Museum. In December 1979, he returned to work at the Office of Monuments Restoration (PP PKZ).

=== Vietnam ===
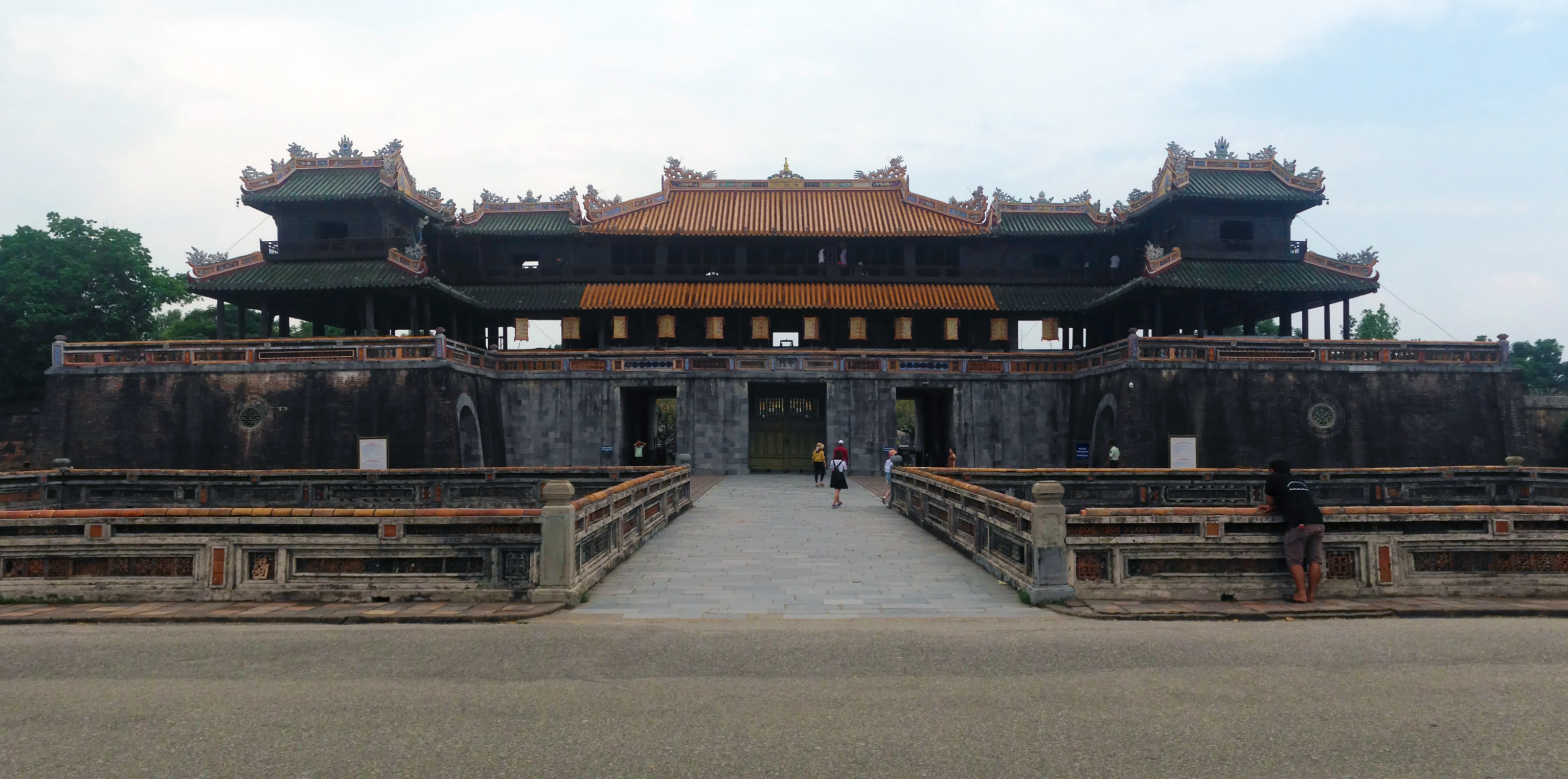
Imperial City of Huế

In 1981, he was assigned to lead the monuments restoration mission in the Socialist Republic of Vietnam. Monuments in Vietnam at that time, after 40 years of war, were badly damaged, so the Vietnamese authorities called for international help in saving monuments. The Polish-Vietnamese Monument Restoration Mission is the first project of its kind that the Office of Monuments Restoration has undertaken in Asia. It was an important challenge for PP PKZ, and Kazimierz Kwiatkowski was the only expert who undertook the task.

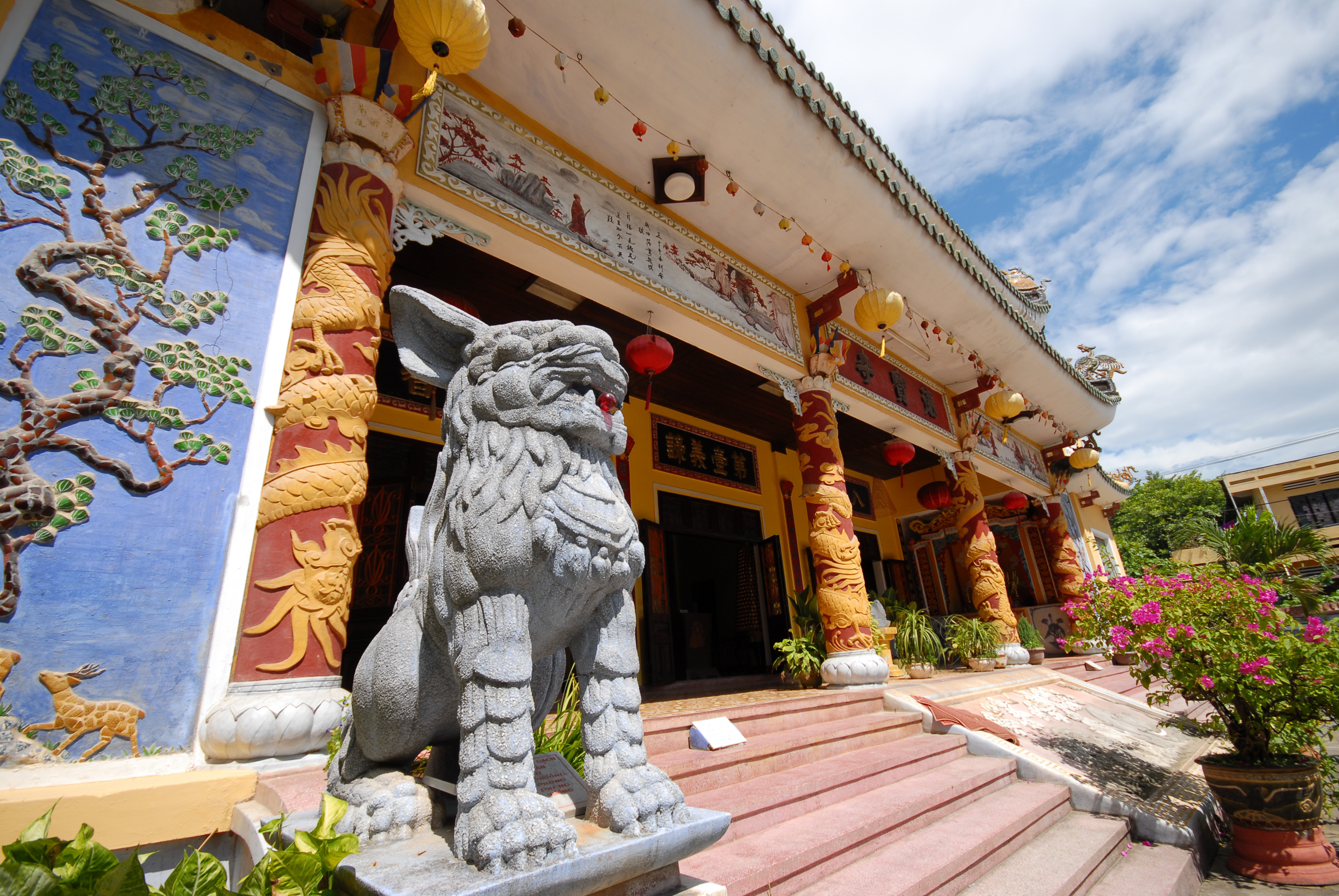
Hội An Ancient Town

Since the early 1980s, he volunteered to go to Vietnam to survey the archaeological remains at Mỹ Sơn, which also became the place where he has been with the longest during his time in Vietnam - nearly 16 years. In 1981, Kwiatkowski started working at Hội An and immediately realized the potential of this city. He, along with Vietnamese experts, researched and prepared a program to restore medieval works of the Cham culture in central Vietnam. The mission focused first on the brick worshiping towers at the holy site complex in the former Amaravati territory of the ancient Champa kingdom.

Kwiatkowski made efforts to lobby the local government to take measures to preserve and restore the ancient town of Hội An and at the same time introduce the distinctive features of Hội An to the world. During his time in Mỹ Sơn, eight people in Kwiatkowski's archeological team died from both bombs left after the Vietnam War and illnesses. In 1991, when the financial source for the archaeological activities of the Polish team of experts was terminated, Kwiatkowski himself called for the creation of funds for his archaeological activities at Mỹ Sơn. Due to financial support that Kwiatkowski obtained from the Association of Friends of Cham Culture in Stuttgart, the Museum of Cham Sculpture opened from 26 March 1994 in Da Nang. Kwiatkowski also led a team of experts to rebuild the Củ Chi tunnels.

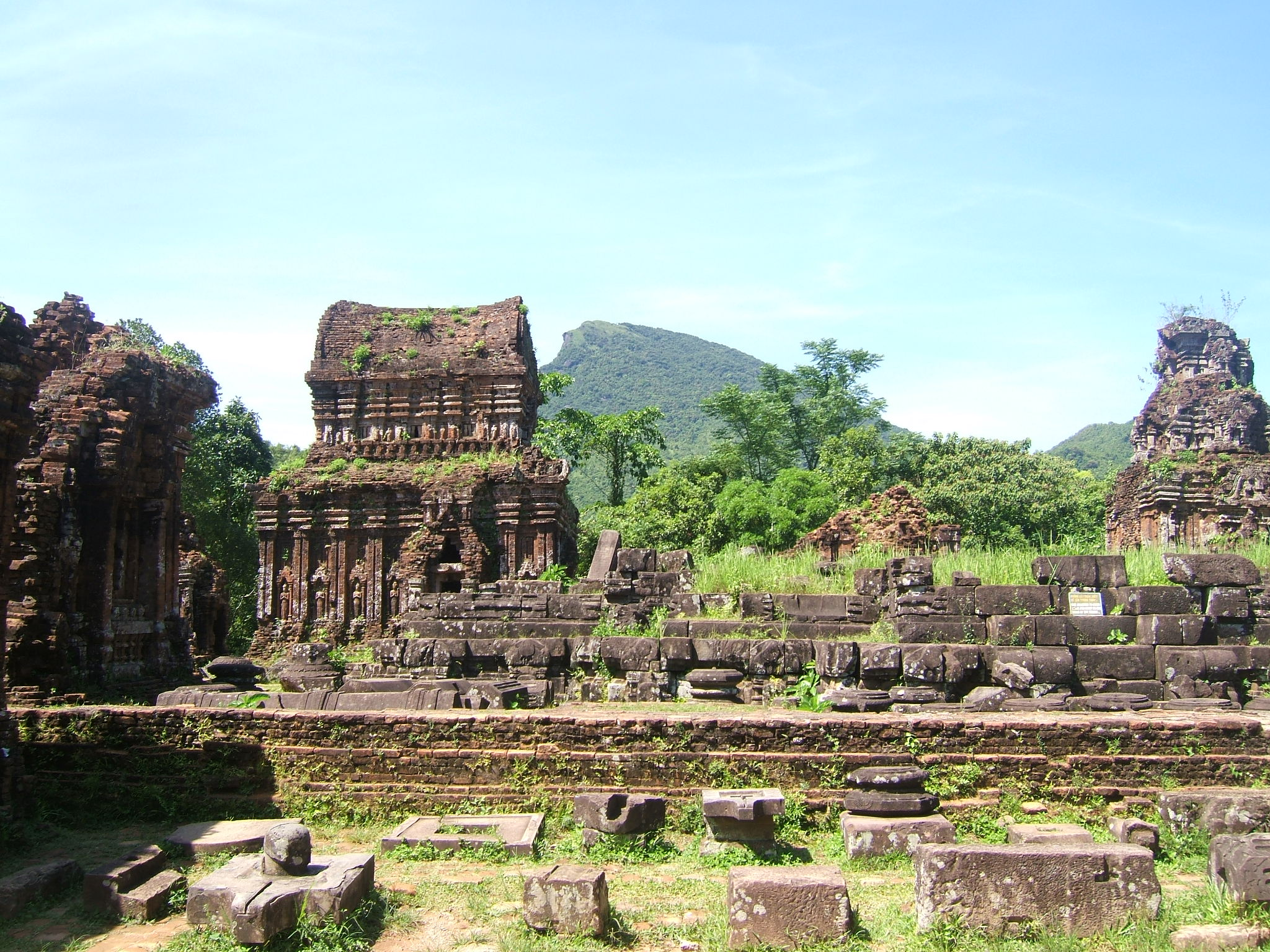
Cham temples at Mỹ Sơn

Despite objections from some experts, he has always persisted in pursuing the principle of archaeological restoration in which the original monument will be preserved to the maximum extent and restoration measures will be applied only to maintain the status quo. Kwiatkowski was the first to pay attention to the special heritage value of Hội An. The wooden constructions are still intact, the excellent planning of the city is preserved and the garment industry is flourishing in the city. He convinced the Vietnamese government to preserve and not to change the buildings in the direction of modernity in Hội An. He himself returned to Poland just to bring chemicals back to Vietnam to help in the restoration of Mỹ Sơn. It is thanks to his efforts that the cities of Hội An and Mỹ Sơn were later recognized as World Cultural Heritage.

From 1981 to 1988, he and a team of photometric experts worked in Vietnam, performing restoration records at the ratio: 1:20 and 1:50 for more than 30 projects. Measurements were carried out not only in Mỹ Sơn, but also in Phan Rang, Quy Nhon, Bắc Ninh, Tam Kỳ, Quang Nam and Tuy Hòa. Kwiatkowski is the author of many publications on Cham art, as well as measures to protect and restore temples in Vietnam. He left behind a lot of projects, scientific documents and records from his studies.

In early 1995, Kwiatkowski and his team began work related to the re-evaluation of the temple-palace complex on the territory of the Imperial City of Huế. In 1997, he became the person in charge of the performance of the palace re-evaluation contract under the charge of the Building Management Authority in Huế.

== Later life ==
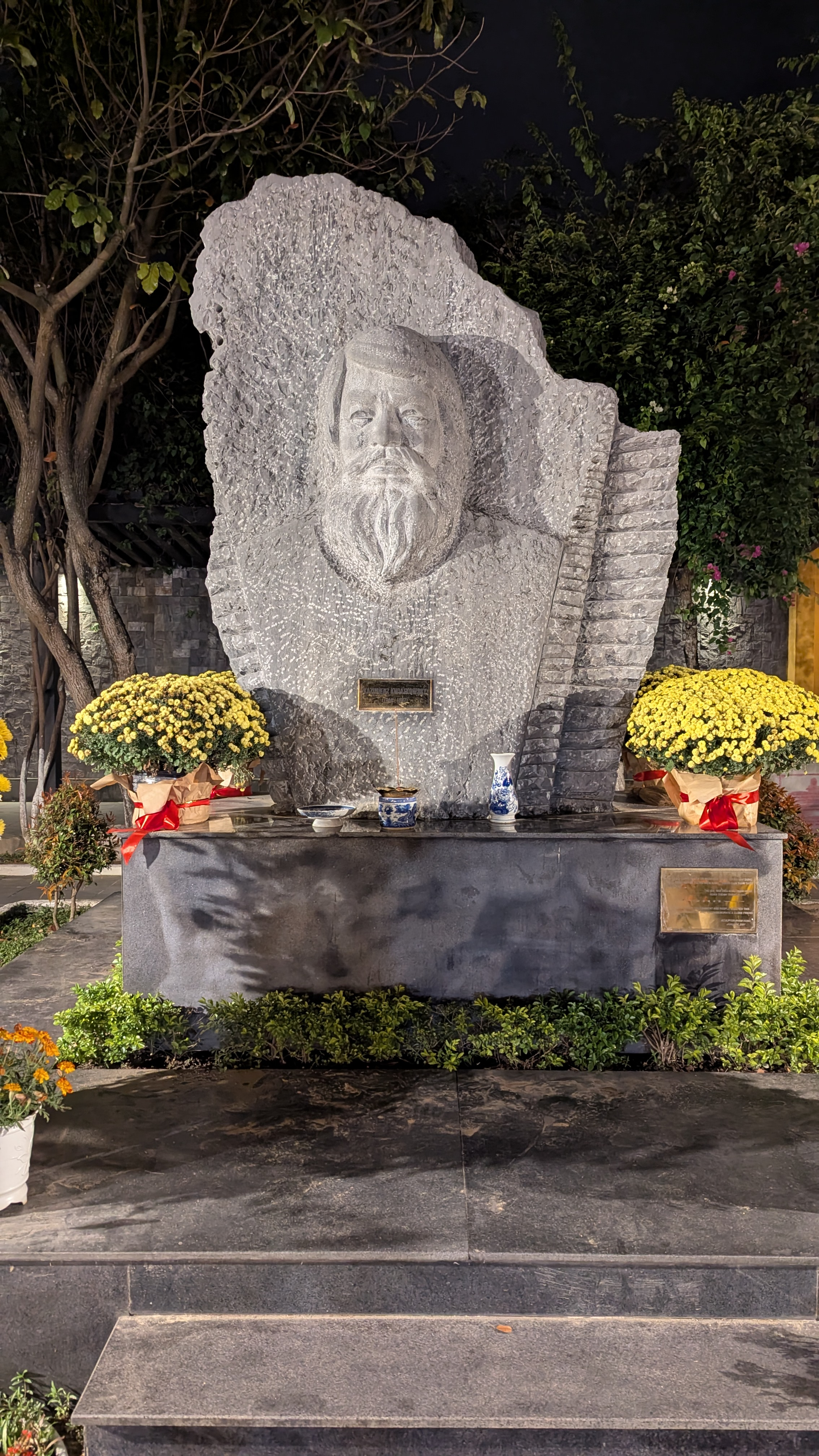
Monument of Kazimierz Kwiatkowski in Hội An

Working in Vietnam for 17 years, Kwiatkowski died on 19 March 1997 at a hotel in Huế, due to a heart attack while still actively participating in the restoration of the Imperial City. His remains were later transferred to Poland.

His funeral was held in Lublin on April 2. Kwiatkowski was buried in the Catholic cemetery next to the Church of St. Agnieszka on Kalinowszczyzna Street in Lublin.

== Personal life and legacy ==
In 1968, Kwiatkowski married Więcesława Porzadna, who was a student at the Mathematics Department of Jagiellonian University. They had three children; two sons and one daughter.

In 2007, the city council of Hội An erected a monument of Kwiatkowski to commemorate his merits. The monument is located on Trần Phú Street of Hội An. In 2009, another statue commemorating Kwiatkowski also began its construction in Mỹ Sơn. In 1999, a collection of articles about him was published in Vietnam with the title Kazik, ký ức bạn bè ('Kazik, Memories of Friends'). In 2017, on the 20th anniversary of his death, the Vietnam-Poland Friendship Association together with Polish Embassy in Hanoi organized an event to commemorate Kwiatkowski.

== Awards and decorations ==
Gold Cross of Merit (1988)
Bronze Cross of Merit (1978)

He was also awarded numerous decorations by the Office of Monuments Restoration.

== Bibliography ==
- Serafinowicz, Jacek; Kwiatkowski, Kazimierz (2006). Polski słownik biograficzny konserwatorów zabytków, red. Henryk Kondziela, Hanna Krzyżanowska, z. 2. Poznań: Wydaw. Poznański. ISBN 8371774168.
