= Lipniak, Parczew County =

Lipniak
- Village
- Location within Poland
- Coordinates: 51°27′52″N 23°9′30″E
- Country: Poland
- Voivodeship: Lublin
- County: Parczew
- Gmina: Sosnowica
- Population: 12

Lipniak [ˈlipɲak] is a village in the administrative district of Gmina Sosnowica, within Parczew County, Lublin Voivodeship, in eastern Poland.
