= Mościska, Parczew County =

Mościska
- Village
- Location within Poland
- Coordinates: 51°33′53″N 23°6′14″E
- Country: Poland
- Voivodeship: Lublin
- County: Parczew
- Gmina: Sosnowica

Mościska [mɔɕˈt͡ɕiska] is a village in the administrative district of Gmina Sosnowica, within Parczew County, Lublin Voivodeship, in eastern Poland.
