= Olchówka =

Olchówka may refer to the following villages in Poland:

- Olchówka, Lublin Voivodeship (east Poland)
- Olchówka, Podlaskie Voivodeship (north-east Poland)
