= Gródek Szlachecki =

- Village
- Location within Poland
- Coordinates: 51°34′22″N 22°47′52″E
- Country: Poland
- Voivodeship: Lublin
- County: Parczew
- Gmina: Siemień

Gródek Szlachecki (Polish pronunciation: [ˈɡrudɛk ʂlaˈxɛtskʲi]) is a village in the administrative district of Gmina Siemień, within Parczew County, Lublin Voivodeship, in eastern Poland.
