= Marianówka, Parczew County =

Marianówka
- Village
- Location within Poland
- Coordinates: 51°38′13″N 23°3′28″E
- Country: Poland
- Voivodeship: Lublin
- County: Parczew
- Gmina: Dębowa Kłoda
- Time zone: UTC+1 (CET)
  - Summer (DST): UTC+2 (CEST)

Marianówka [marjaˈnufka] is a village in the administrative district of Gmina Dębowa Kłoda, within Parczew County, Lublin Voivodeship, in eastern Poland.

== History ==
13 Polish citizens were murdered by Nazi Germany in the village during World War II.
