= Antoni Sosnowski =

Polish politician

member of Sejm 2005-2007
- In office 25 September 2005 – 2007

Personal details
- Born: 1 June 1946 (age 79)
- Party: League of Polish Families

Antoni Sosnowski (born 1 June 1946 in Żmiarki) is a Polish politician. He was elected to the Sejm on 25 September 2005, getting 5,537 votes in 32 Sosnowiec district as a candidate from the League of Polish Families list.

== See also ==
- Members of Polish Sejm 2005-2007
