= Nietiahy =

- Village
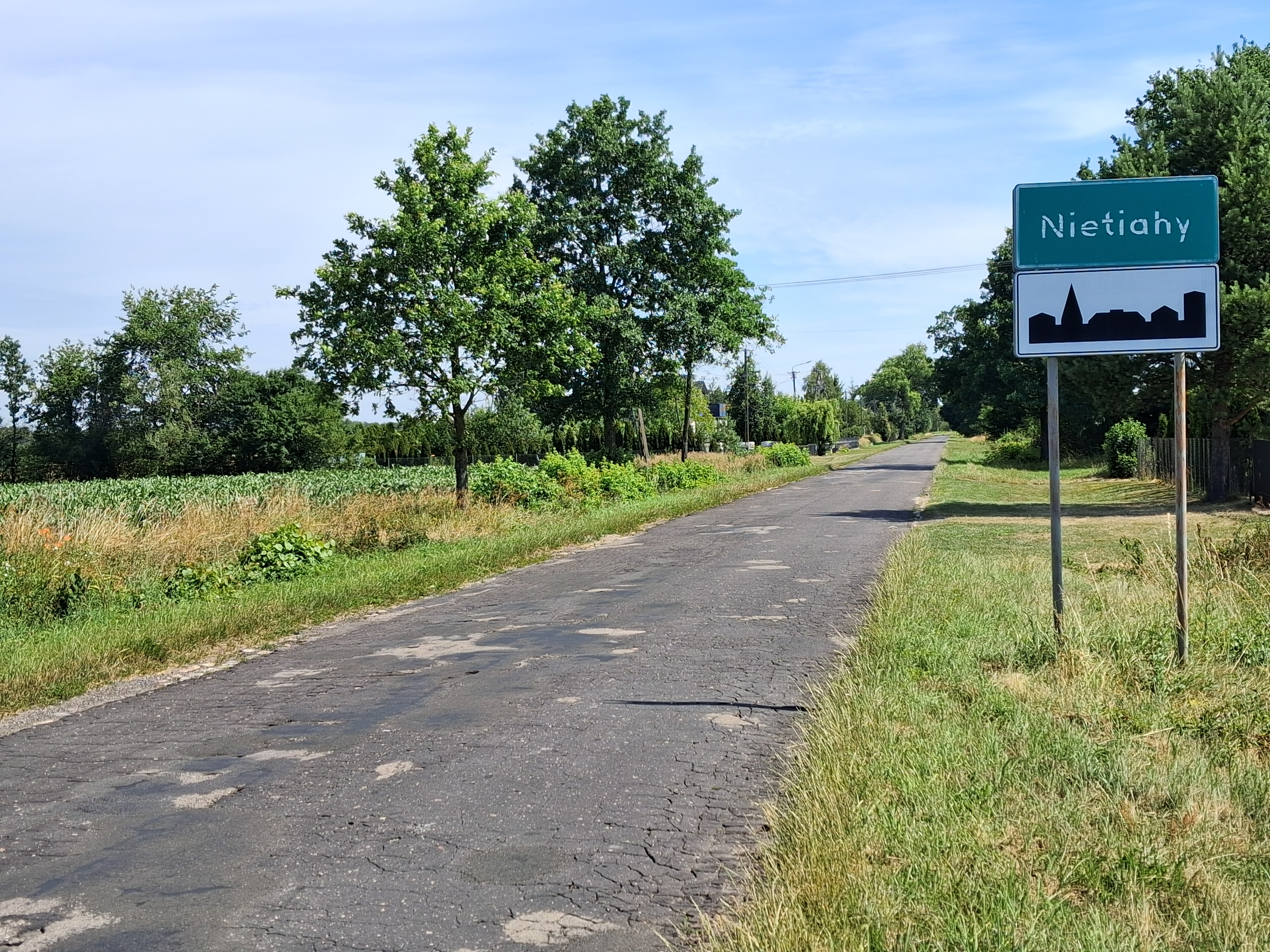

- Location within Poland
- Coordinates: 51°35′19″N 23°4′37″E
- Country: Poland
- Voivodeship: Lublin
- County: Parczew
- Gmina: Dębowa Kłoda
- Time zone: UTC+1 (CET)
  - Summer (DST): UTC+2 (CEST)

Nietiahy [ɲɛˈtjaxɨ] is a village in the administrative district of Gmina Dębowa Kłoda, within Parczew County, Lublin Voivodeship, in eastern Poland.

== History ==
Four Polish citizens were murdered by Nazi Germany in the village during World War II.
