= Amelin, Parczew County =

Amelin
- Village
- Location within Poland
- Coordinates: 51°37′35″N 22°40′38″E
- Country: Poland
- Voivodaeship: Lublin
- County: Parczew
- Gmina: Siemień

Amelin [aˈmɛlin] is a village in the administrative district of Gmina Siemień, within Parczew County, Lublin Voivodeship, in eastern Poland.
