= Pasieka, Parczew County =

Pasieka
- Village
- Location within Poland
- Coordinates: 51°30′15″N 23°7′44″E
- Country: Poland
- Voivodeship: Lublin
- County: Parczew
- Gmina: Sosnowica

Pasieka [paˈɕɛka] is a village in the administrative district of Gmina Sosnowica, within Parczew County, Lublin Voivodeship, in eastern Poland.
