= Paszenki =

- Village
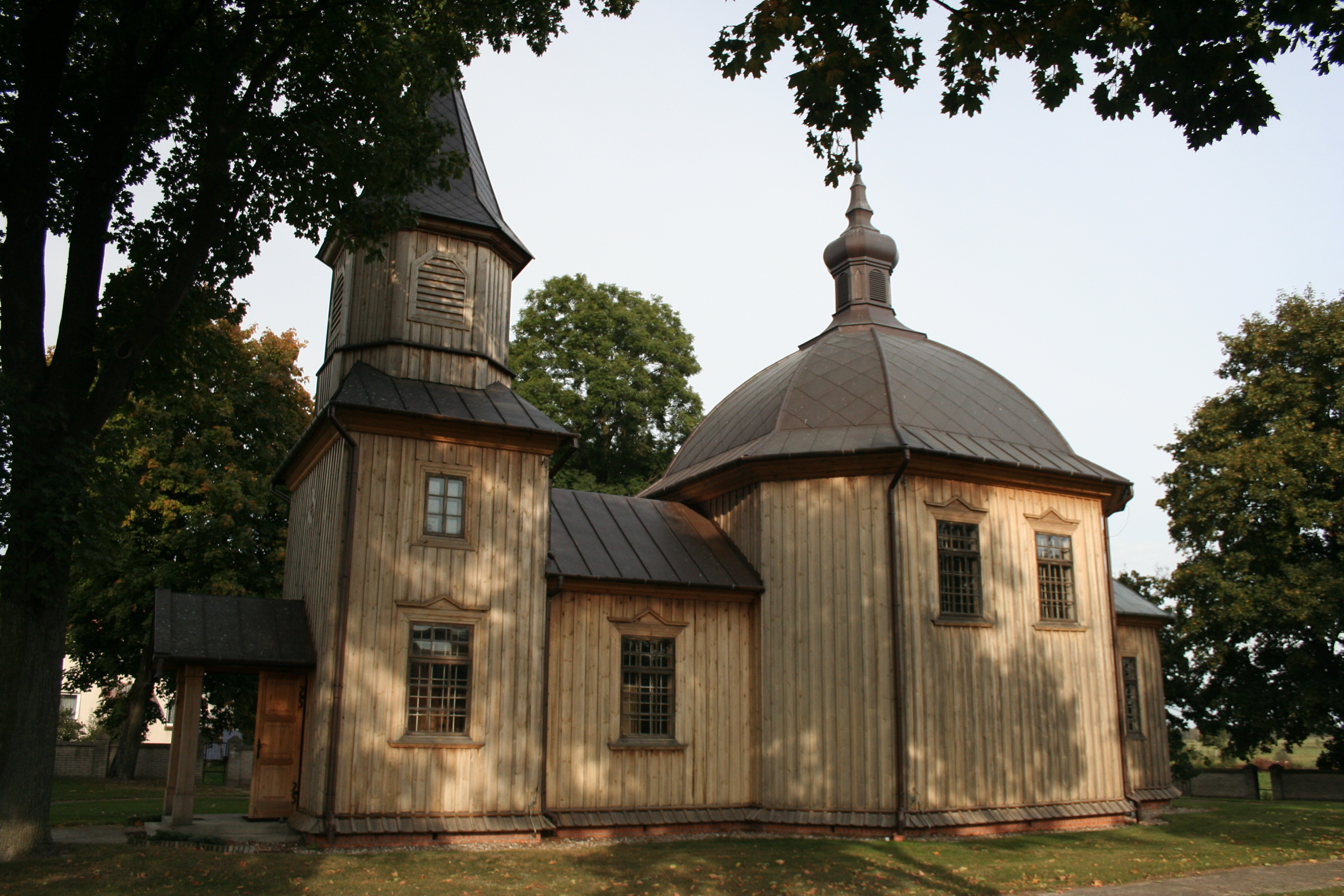
- Holy Trinity church in Paszenki

- Location within Poland
- Coordinates: 51°43′N 23°8′E
- Country: Poland
- Voivodeship: Lublin
- County: Parczew
- Gmina: Jabłoń
- Time zone: UTC+1 (CET)
  - Summer (DST): UTC+2 (CEST)

Paszenki [paˈʂɛŋki] is a village in the administrative district of Gmina Jabłoń, within Parczew County, Lublin Voivodeship, in eastern Poland.

== History ==
Six Polish citizens were murdered by Nazi Germany in the village during World War II.
