= Juliopol =

Juliopol may refer to the following places in Poland:

- Juliopol, Lublin Voivodeship (east Poland)
- Juliopol, Masovian Voivodeship (east-central Poland)
