= Kropiwki =

- Village
- Location within Poland
- Coordinates: 51°33′56″N 23°8′40″E
- Country: Poland
- Voivodeship: Lublin
- County: Parczew
- Gmina: Sosnowica
- Time zone: UTC+1 (CET)
  - Summer (DST): UTC+2 (CEST)

Kropiwki [krɔˈpifki] is a village in the administrative district of Gmina Sosnowica, within Parczew County, Lublin Voivodeship, in eastern Poland.

== History ==
Eleven Polish citizens were murdered by Nazi Germany in the village during World War II.
