= Puchowa Góra =

- Village
- Location within Poland
- Coordinates: 51°42′N 23°7′E
- Country: Poland
- Voivodeship: Lublin
- County: Parczew
- Gmina: Jabłoń

Puchowa Góra [puˈxɔva ˈɡura] is a village in the administrative district of Gmina Jabłoń, within Parczew County, Lublin Voivodeship, in eastern Poland.
