= Miłków, Lublin Voivodeship =

Miłków
- Village
- Location within Poland
- Coordinates: 51°37′49″N 22°49′57″E
- Country: Poland
- Voivodeship: Lublin
- County: Parczew
- Gmina: Siemień

Miłków [ˈmiu̯kuf] is a village in the administrative district of Gmina Siemień, within Parczew County, Lublin Voivodeship, in eastern Poland.
