= Augustówka (disambiguation) =

Augustówka is a part of the Mokotów district of Warsaw.

Augustówka may also refer to:

- Augustówka, Lublin Voivodeship (east Poland)
- Augustówka, Otwock County, Masovian Voivodeship (east-central Poland)
- Augustówka, Warmian-Masurian Voivodeship (north Poland)
- Avhustivka, Ternopil Oblast, Ukraine, formerly Augustówka
