= Nadzieja =

Nadzieja may refer to:

- Nadzieja, Lublin Voivodeship
- Nadzieja, Masovian Voivodeship
