= Białka, Parczew County =

Village in Poland

Białka
- Village
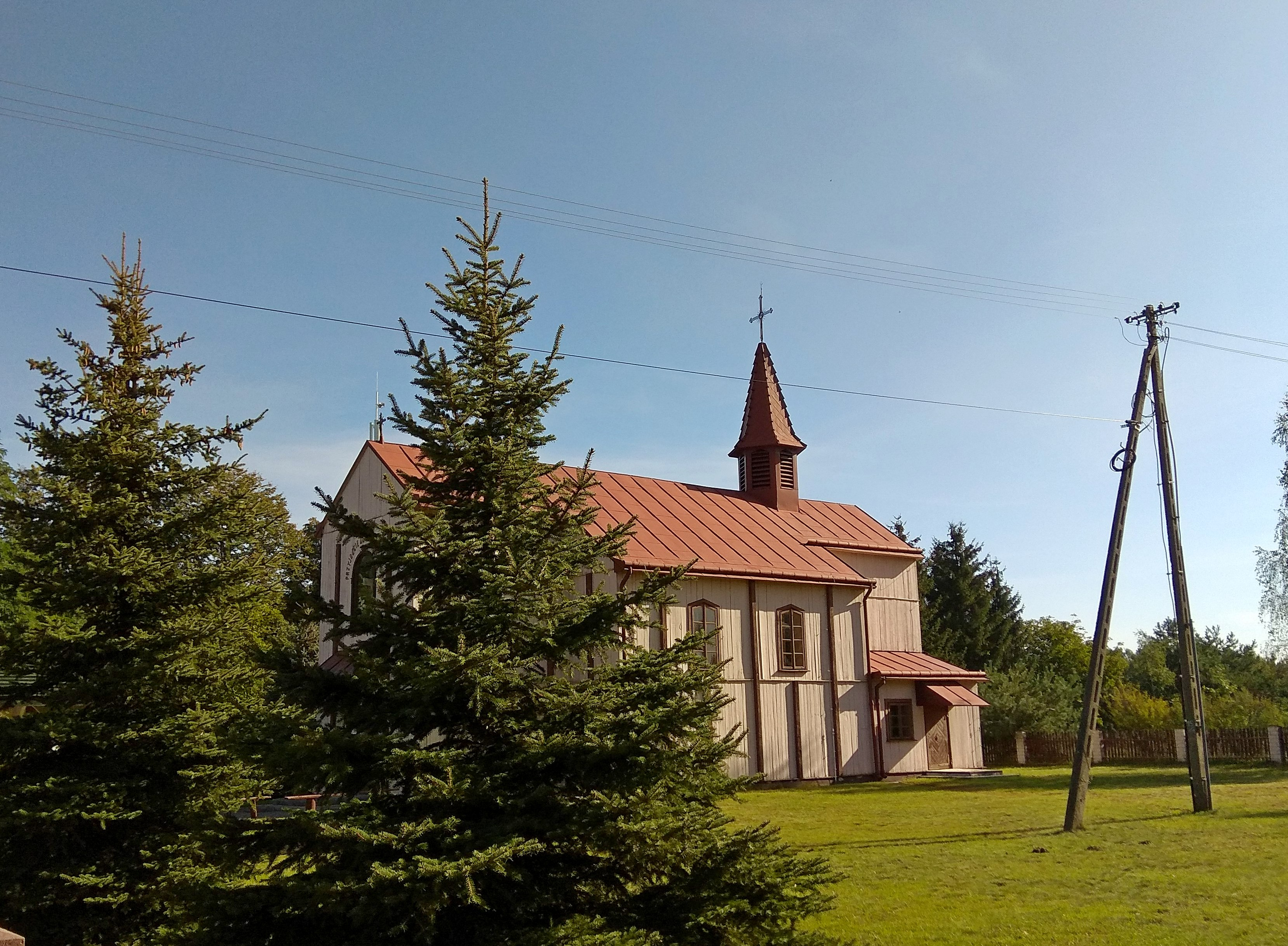
- Sacred Heart church in Białka

- Location within Poland
- Coordinates: 51°32′5.5″N 23°0′21.2″E
- Country: Poland
- Voivodeship: Lublin
- County: Parczew
- Gmina: Dębowa Kłoda

Population
  - Total: 280
- Time zone: UTC+1 (CET)
  - Summer (DST): UTC+2 (CEST)
- Vehicle registration: LPA

Białka [ˈbjau̯ka] is a village in the administrative district of Gmina Dębowa Kłoda, within Parczew County, Lublin Voivodeship, in eastern Poland.

== History ==
Following the Nazi invasion of Poland, the village became part of the General Government. In December 1942 the Białka massacre took place, in which close to a hundred villagers were executed by the German occupiers for helping local communist partisans.
