= Bednarzówka =

Bednarzówka may refer to the following villages in Poland:

- Bednarzówka, Lublin Voivodeship (east Poland)
- Bednarzówka, Warmian-Masurian Voivodeship (north-east Poland)
