= Dawidy, Lublin Voivodeship =

Dawidy
- Village
- Location within Poland
- Coordinates: 51°44′23″N 23°1′33″E
- Country: Poland
- Voivodeship: Lublin
- County: Parczew
- Gmina: Jabłoń
- Population (approx.): 460

Dawidy [daˈvidɨ] is a village in the administrative district of Gmina Jabłoń, within Parczew County, Lublin Voivodeship, in eastern Poland.
