= Libiszów, Lublin Voivodeship =

Libiszów
- Village
- Location within Poland
- Coordinates: 51°31′51″N 23°2′20″E
- Country: Poland
- Voivodeship: Lublin
- County: Parczew
- Gmina: Sosnowica

Libiszów [liˈbiʂuf] is a village in the administrative district of Gmina Sosnowica, within Parczew County, Lublin Voivodeship, in eastern Poland.
