= Izabelin, Lublin Voivodeship =

Izabelin
- Village
- Location within Poland
- Coordinates: 51°31′18″N 23°8′46″E
- Country: Poland
- Voivodeship: Lublin
- County: Parczew
- Gmina: Sosnowica

Izabelin [izaˈbɛlin] is a village in the administrative district of Gmina Sosnowica, within Parczew County, Lublin Voivodeship, in eastern Poland.
