= Stępków =

- Village
- Location within Poland
- Coordinates: 51°36′38.8″N 22°56′43.7″E
- Country: Poland
- Voivodeship: Lublin
- County: Parczew
- Gmina: Dębowa Kłoda

Stępków [ˈstɛmpkuf] is a village in the administrative district of Gmina Dębowa Kłoda, within Parczew County, Lublin Voivodeship, in eastern Poland.
