= Korona, Lublin Voivodeship =

Korona
- Village
- Location within Poland
- Coordinates: 51°38′2″N 23°2′4″E
- Country: Poland
- Voivodeship: Lublin
- County: Parczew
- Gmina: Dębowa Kłoda

Korona (Polish: [kɔˈrɔna]) is a village in the administrative district of Gmina Dębowa Kłoda, within Parczew County, Lublin Voivodeship, in eastern Poland.
