= Żminne =

- Village
- Location within Poland
- Coordinates: 51°39′8″N 22°46′36″E
- Country: Poland
- Voivodeship: Lublin
- County: Parczew
- Gmina: Siemień

Żminne [ˈʐminnɛ] is a village in the administrative district of Gmina Siemień, within Parczew County, Lublin Voivodeship, in eastern Poland.
