= Górki, Parczew County =

Górki
- Village
- Location within Poland
- Coordinates: 51°29′54″N 23°5′24″E
- Country: Poland
- Voivodeship: Lublin
- County: Parczew
- Gmina: Sosnowica

Górki [ˈɡurki] is a village in the administrative district of Gmina Sosnowica, within Parczew County, Lublin Voivodeship, in eastern Poland.
