= Działyń =

Działyń may refer to the following places in Poland:

- Działyń, Kuyavian-Pomeranian Voivodeship (north-central Poland)
- Działyń, Lublin Voivodeship (east Poland)
- Działyń, Masovian Voivodeship (east-central Poland)
- Działyń, Greater Poland Voivodeship (west-central Poland)
