= Kalinka, Lublin Voivodeship =

Kalinka
- Village
- Location within Poland
- Coordinates: 51°40′27″N 23°6′42″E
- Country: Poland
- Voivodeship: Lublin
- County: Parczew
- Gmina: Jabłoń

Kalinka [kaˈlinka] is a village in the administrative district of Gmina Jabłoń, within Parczew County, Lublin Voivodeship, in eastern Poland.
