= Sewerynówka, Parczew County =

Sewerynówka
- Village
- Location within Poland
- Coordinates: 51°35′14″N 22°44′15″E
- Country: Poland
- Voivodeship: Lublin
- County: Parczew
- Gmina: Siemień

Sewerynówka [sɛvɛrɨˈnufka] is a village in the administrative district of Gmina Siemień, within Parczew County, Lublin Voivodeship, in eastern Poland.
