= Władysławów, Parczew County =

Władysławów
- Village
- Location within Poland
- Coordinates: 51°35′30″N 22°47′4″E
- Country: Poland
- Voivodeship: Lublin
- County: Parczew
- Gmina: Siemień

Władysławów [vwadɨˈswavuf] is a village in the administrative district of Gmina Siemień, within Parczew County, Lublin Voivodeship, in eastern Poland.
