= Sosnowica-Dwór =

- Village
- Location within Poland
- Coordinates: 51°29′56″N 23°9′35″E
- Country: Poland
- Voivodeship: Lublin
- County: Parczew
- Gmina: Sosnowica

Sosnowica-Dwór [sɔsnɔˈvit͡sa ˈdvur] is a village in the administrative district of Gmina Sosnowica, within Parczew County, Lublin Voivodeship, in eastern Poland.
