= Gęś, Lublin Voivodeship =

Gęś
- Village
- Location within Poland
- Coordinates: 51°42′12″N 23°0′15″E
- Country: Poland
- Voivodeship: Lublin
- County: Parczew
- Gmina: Jabłoń

Gęś [ɡɛ̃ɕ] is a village in the administrative district of Gmina Jabłoń, within Parczew County, Lublin Voivodeship, in eastern Poland.
