= Nowy Orzechów =

- Village
- Location within Poland
- Coordinates: 51°27′30″N 23°0′23″E
- Country: Poland
- Voivodeship: Lublin
- County: Parczew
- Gmina: Sosnowica
- Time zone: UTC+1 (CET)
  - Summer (DST): UTC+2 (CEST)

Nowy Orzechów [ˈnɔvɨ ɔˈʐɛxuf] is a village in the administrative district of Gmina Sosnowica, within Parczew County, Lublin Voivodeship, in eastern Poland.

== History ==
Five Polish citizens were murdered by Nazi Germany in the village during World War II.
