= Stary Orzechów =

- Village
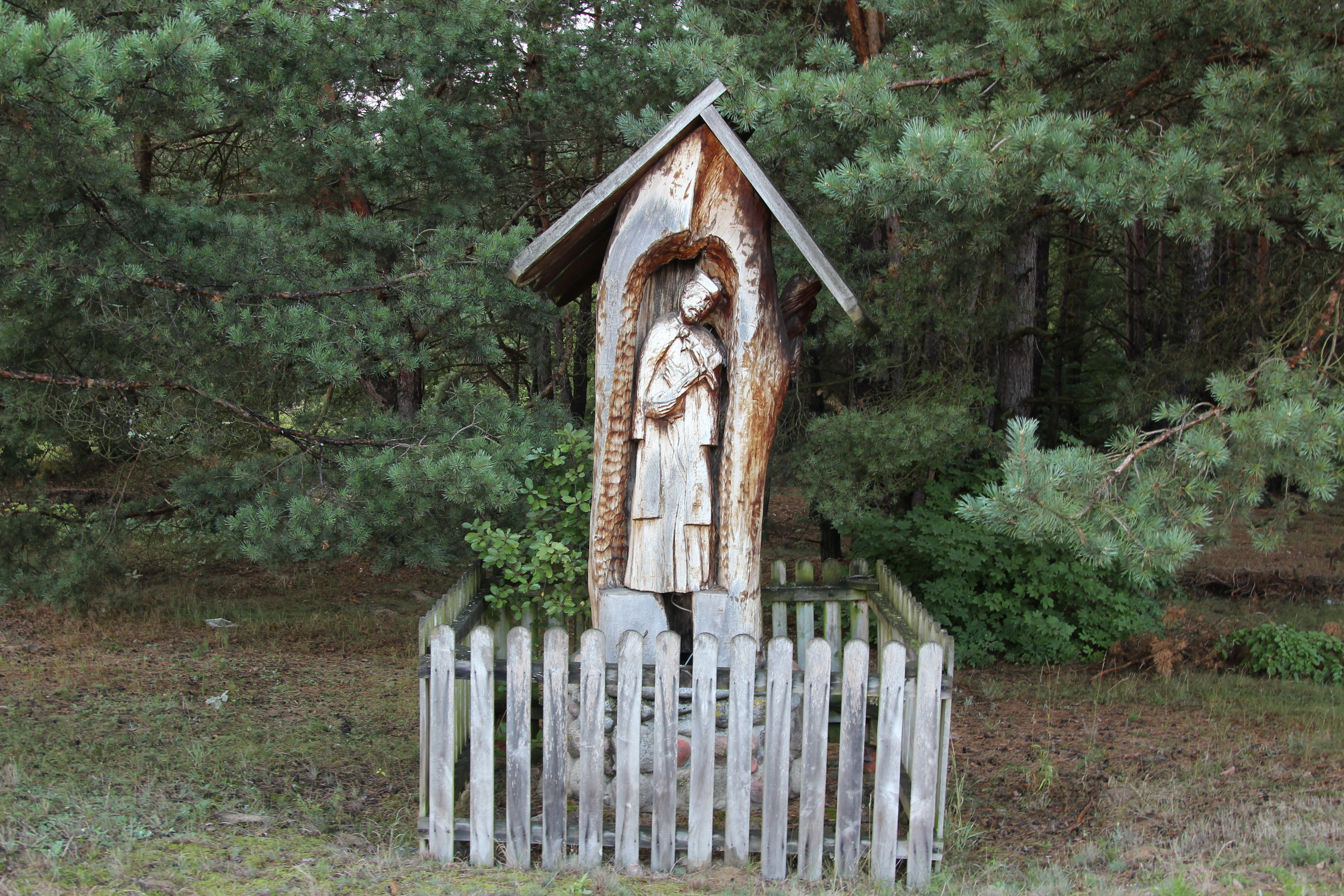
- Saint John of Nepomuk statue

- Location within Poland
- Coordinates: 51°29′18″N 23°1′35″E
- Country: Poland
- Voivodeship: Lublin
- County: Parczew
- Gmina: Sosnowica
- Time zone: UTC+1 (CET)
  - Summer (DST): UTC+2 (CEST)

Stary Orzechów [ˈstarɨ ɔˈʐɛxuf] is a village in the administrative district of Gmina Sosnowica, within Parczew County, Lublin Voivodeship, in eastern Poland.

== History ==
17 Polish citizens were murdered by Nazi Germany in the village during World War II.
