= Glinny Stok =

- Village
- Location within Poland
- Coordinates: 51°38′50″N 22°50′14″E
- Country: Poland
- Voivodeship: Lublin
- County: Parczew
- Gmina: Siemień
- Time zone: UTC+1 (CET)
  - Summer (DST): UTC+2 (CEST)

Glinny Stok [ˈɡlinnɨ ˈstɔk] is a village in the administrative district of Gmina Siemień, within Parczew County, Lublin Voivodeship, in eastern Poland.

== History ==
17 Polish citizens were murdered by Nazi Germany in the village during World War II.
