= Lejno =

- Village
- Location within Poland
- Coordinates: 51°26′50″N 23°3′0″E
- Country: Poland
- Voivodeship: Lublin
- County: Parczew
- Gmina: Sosnowica
- Population: 250

Lejno [ˈlɛi̯nɔ] is a village in the administrative district of Gmina Sosnowica, within Parczew County, Lublin Voivodeship, in eastern Poland.
