= Makoszka =

- Village
- Location within Poland
- Coordinates: 51°35′15″N 22°55′59″E
- Country: Poland
- Voivodeship: Lublin
- County: Parczew
- Gmina: Dębowa Kłoda
- Population (2006): 130

Makoszka [maˈkɔʂka] is a village in the administrative district of Gmina Dębowa Kłoda, within Parczew County, Lublin Voivodeship, in eastern Poland.
