= Lubiczyn =

Lubiczyn may refer to the following villages in Poland:

- Lubiczyn, Lublin Voivodeship (east Poland)
- Lubiczyn, West Pomeranian Voivodeship (north-west Poland)
