= Wierzchowiny =

Wierzchowiny may refer to the following places:

- Wierzchowiny, Krasnystaw County in Lublin Voivodeship (east Poland)
- Wierzchowiny, Radzyń County in Lublin Voivodeship (east Poland)
- Wierzchowiny, Parczew County in Lublin Voivodeship (east Poland), split into:
  - Wierzchowiny Nowe
  - Wierzchowiny Stare
- Wierzchowiny, Zamość County in Lublin Voivodeship (east Poland)
- Wierzchowiny, Subcarpathian Voivodeship (south-east Poland)
- Wierzchowiny, Masovian Voivodeship (east-central Poland)
