= Pomyków, Lublin Voivodeship =

Pomyków
- Village
- Location within Poland
- Coordinates: 51°38′29″N 22°44′40″E
- Country: Poland
- Voivodeship: Lublin
- County: Parczew
- Gmina: Siemień

Pomyków [pɔˈmɨkuf] is a village in the administrative district of Gmina Siemień, within Parczew County, Lublin Voivodeship, in eastern Poland.
