= Zbójno, Lublin Voivodeship =

Zbójno
- Village
- Location within Poland
- Coordinates: 51°29′55″N 23°9′35″E
- Country: Poland
- Voivodeship: Lublin
- County: Parczew
- Gmina: Sosnowica

Zbójno [ˈzbui̯nɔ] is a village in the administrative district of Gmina Sosnowica, within Parczew County, Lublin Voivodeship, in eastern Poland.
