= Uhnin =

- Village
- Location within Poland
- Coordinates: 51°35′N 23°2′E
- Country: Poland
- Voivodeship: Lublin
- County: Parczew
- Gmina: Dębowa Kłoda

Uhnin [ˈuxnin] is a village in the administrative district of Gmina Dębowa Kłoda, within Parczew County, Lublin Voivodeship, in eastern Poland.
