= Bednarzówka, Lublin Voivodeship =

Bednarzówka
- Village
- Location within Poland
- Coordinates: 51°37′N 23°3′E
- Country: Poland
- Voivodeship: Lublin
- County: Parczew
- Gmina: Dębowa Kłoda

Bednarzówka [bɛdnaˈʐufka] is a village in the administrative district of Gmina Dębowa Kłoda, within Parczew County, Lublin Voivodeship, in eastern Poland.
