= Siemień =

- Village
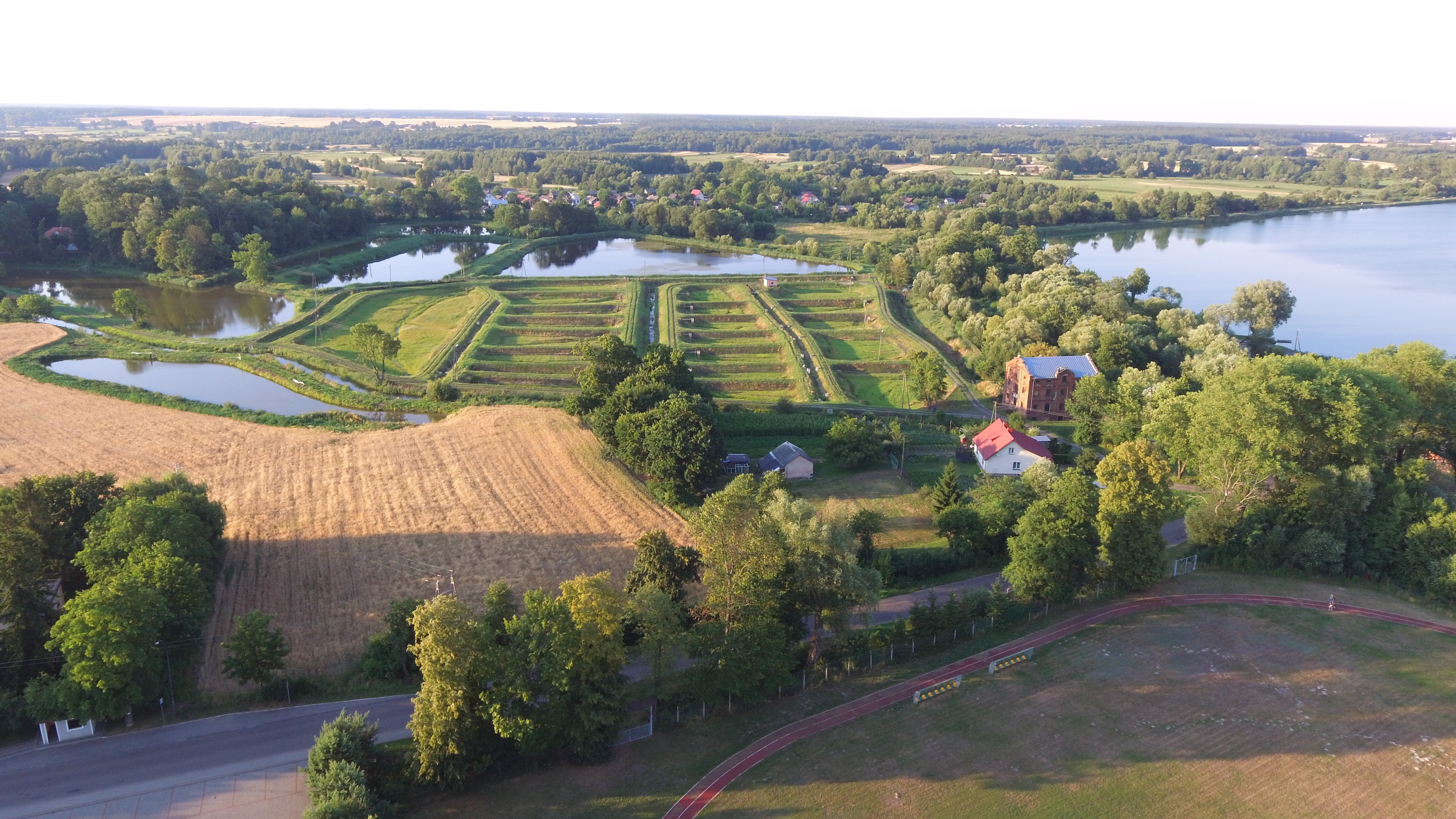

- Location within Poland
- Coordinates: 51°38′N 22°46′E
- Country: Poland
- Voivodeship: Lublin
- County: Parczew
- Gmina: Siemień
- Population: 581
- Time zone: UTC+1 (CET)
  - Summer (DST): UTC+2 (CEST)

Siemień [ˈɕɛmjɛɲ] is a village in Parczew County, Lublin Voivodeship, in eastern Poland. It is the seat of the gmina (administrative district) called Gmina Siemień.
