= Działyń, Lublin Voivodeship =

Działyń
- Village
- Location within Poland
- Coordinates: 51°36′18″N 22°42′26″E
- Country: Poland
- Voivodeship: Lublin
- County: Parczew
- Gmina: Siemień

Działyń [ˈd͡ʑawɨɲ] is a village in the administrative district of Gmina Siemień, within Parczew County, Lublin Voivodeship, in eastern Poland.
