= Pachole =

- Village
- Location within Poland
- Coordinates: 51°38′N 23°7′E
- Country: Poland
- Voivodeship: Lublin
- County: Parczew
- Gmina: Dębowa Kłoda

Pachole [paˈxɔlɛ] is a village in the administrative district of Gmina Dębowa Kłoda, within Parczew County, Lublin Voivodeship, in eastern Poland.
