= Gmina Siemień =

Gmina Siemień Siemień Commune
- Gmina
- Coat of arms

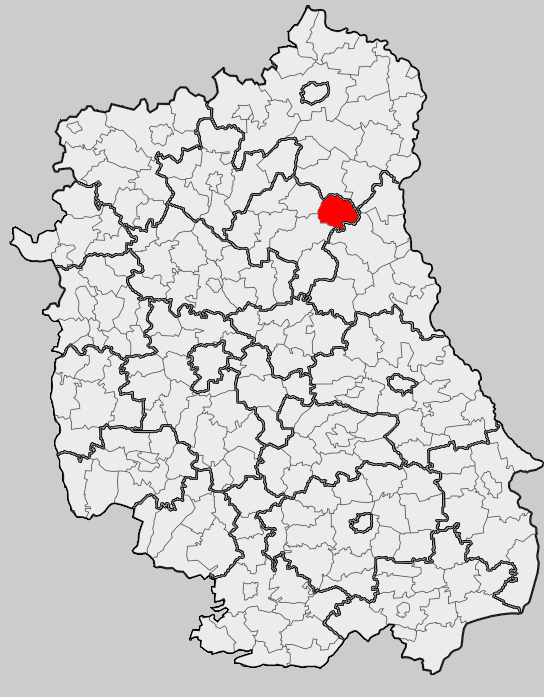
- Location within the county and voivodeship
- Coordinates (Siemień): 51°38′N 22°46′E
- Country: Poland
- Voivodeship: Lublin
- County: Parczew
- Seat: Siemień

Area
  - Total: 110.93 km^{2} (42.83 sq mi)

Population (2014)
  - Total: 4,712
  - Density: 42.48/km^{2} (110.0/sq mi)
- Website: http://www.siemien.pl

Gmina Siemień is a rural gmina (administrative district) in Parczew County, Lublin Voivodeship, in eastern Poland. Its seat is the village of Siemień, which lies approximately 7 kilometres (4 mi) west of Parczew and 45 km (28 mi) north of the regional capital Lublin.

The gmina covers an area of 110.93 square kilometres (42.8 sq mi), and as of 2006 its total population is 4,825 (4,712 in 2014).

== Neighbouring gminas ==
Gmina Siemień is bordered by the gminas of Czemierniki, Milanów, Niedźwiada, Ostrówek, Parczew and Wohyń.

== Villages ==
The gmina contains the following villages having the status of sołectwo: Amelin, Augustówka, Działyń, Glinny Stok, Gródek Szlachecki, Jezioro, Juliopol, Łubka, Miłków, Miłków-Kolonia, Nadzieja, Pomyków, Sewerynówka, Siemień, Siemień-Kolonia, Tulniki, Wierzchowiny, Władysławów, Wola Tulnicka, Wólka Siemieńska and Żminne.
