= Lubiczyn, Lublin Voivodeship =

Lubiczyn
- Village
- Location within Poland
- Coordinates: 51°37′N 23°5′E
- Country: Poland
- Voivodeship: Lublin
- County: Parczew
- Gmina: Dębowa Kłoda
- Population: 220

Lubiczyn (Polish pronunciation: [luˈbit͡ʂɨn]) is a village in the administrative district of Gmina Dębowa Kłoda, within Parczew County, Lublin Voivodeship, in eastern Poland.
