= Gmina Jabłoń =

Gmina Jabłoń Jabłoń Commune
- Gmina
- Coat of arms

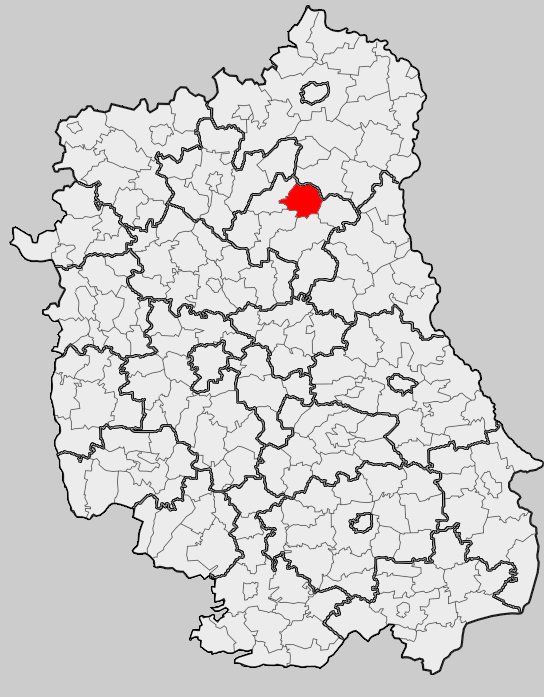
- Location within the county and voivodeship
- Coordinates (Jabłoń): 51°43′N 23°5′E
- Country: Poland
- Voivodeship: Lublin
- County: Parczew
- Seat: Jabłoń

Area
  - Total: 110.98 km^{2} (42.85 sq mi)

Population (2014)
  - Total: 3,928
  - Density: 35.39/km^{2} (91.67/sq mi)
- Website: http://www.jablon.pl/

Gmina Jabłoń is a rural gmina (administrative district) in Parczew County, Lublin Voivodeship, in eastern Poland. Its seat is the village of Jabłoń, which lies approximately 18 kilometres (11 mi) north-east of Parczew and 63 km (39 mi) north-east of the regional capital Lublin.

The gmina covers an area of 110.98 square kilometres (42.8 sq mi), and as of 2006 its total population is 4,177 (3,928 in 2014).

== Neighbouring gminas ==
Gmina Jabłoń is bordered by the gminas of Dębowa Kłoda, Milanów, Parczew, Podedwórze and Wisznice.

== Villages ==
The gmina contains the following villages having the status of sołectwo: Dawidy, Gęś, Holendernia, Jabłoń, Kalinka, Kolano, Kolano-Kolonia, Kudry, Łubno, Paszenki, Puchowa Góra and Wantopol.
