= Sosnowica, Lublin Voivodeship =

Sosnowica
- Village
- Location within Poland
- Coordinates: 51°31′19″N 23°5′13″E
- Country: Poland
- Voivodeship: Lublin
- County: Parczew
- Gmina: Sosnowica
- Population: 678

Sosnowica [sɔsnɔˈvit͡sa] is a village in Parczew County, Lublin Voivodeship, in eastern Poland. It is the seat of the gmina (administrative district) called Gmina Sosnowica.

The Jewish partisan leader Yechiel (Chil) Grynszpan was born in the town. The Jewish population of the town, which numbered 300 Jews, were murdered during the Holocaust.

The village has a current population of 678.

In the central part of the village, there is an Orthodox Saints Peter and Paul Church. The church served as the parish center from 1894 to 1946, with a break between 1915 and 1919 when the local Orthodox population was displaced. After the deportations of the Orthodox Ukrainian population as part of the resettlements to the Soviet Union and Operation Vistula, the church was abandoned and repurposed as a warehouse. Most of its historic furnishings were destroyed at that time. After 1989, the building was restored for liturgical use as a filial church. The Divine Liturgy is celebrated once a year on the feast day of the patron saints.

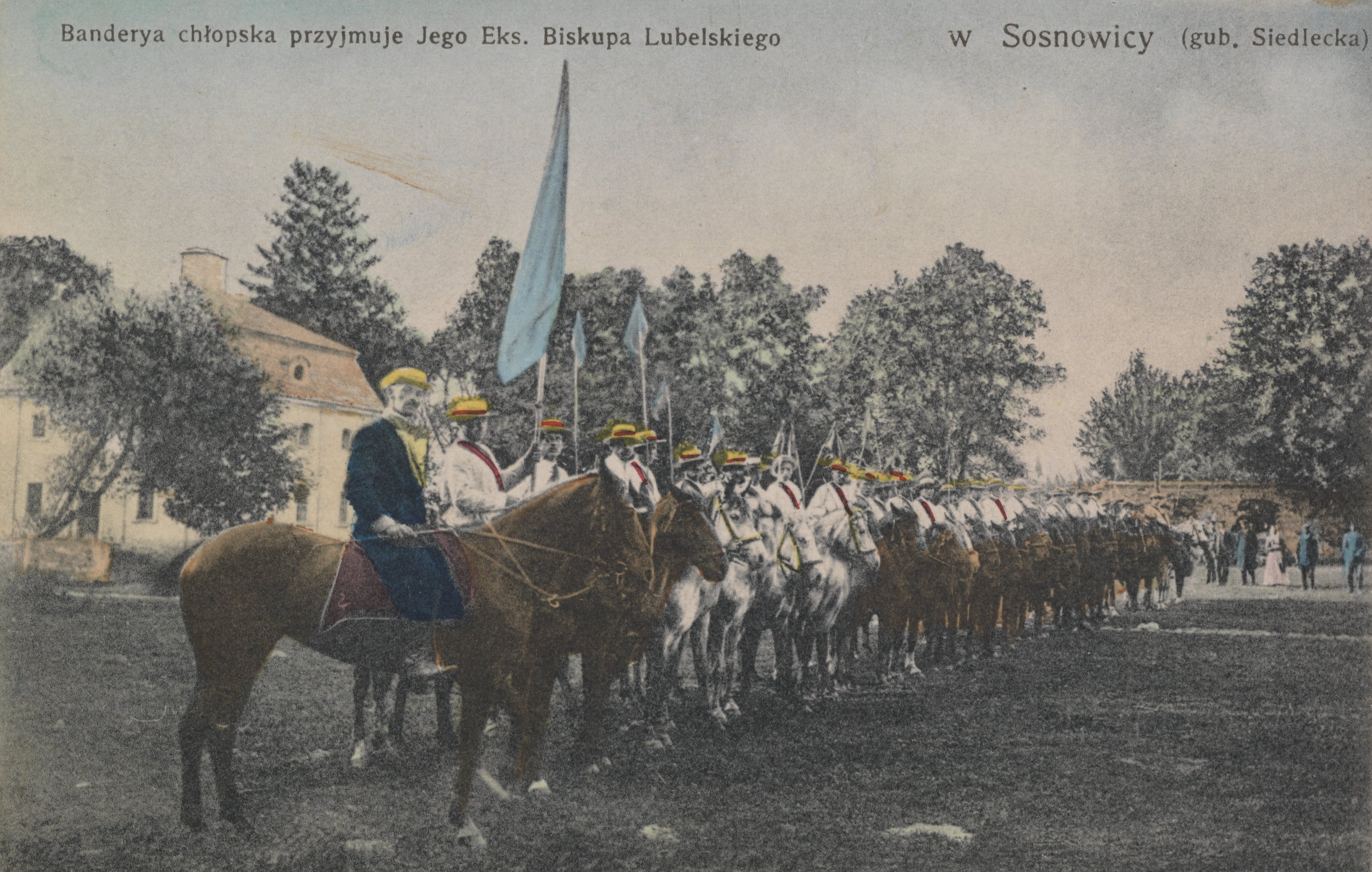
Welcoming of the Bishop of Lublin, 1905-1906

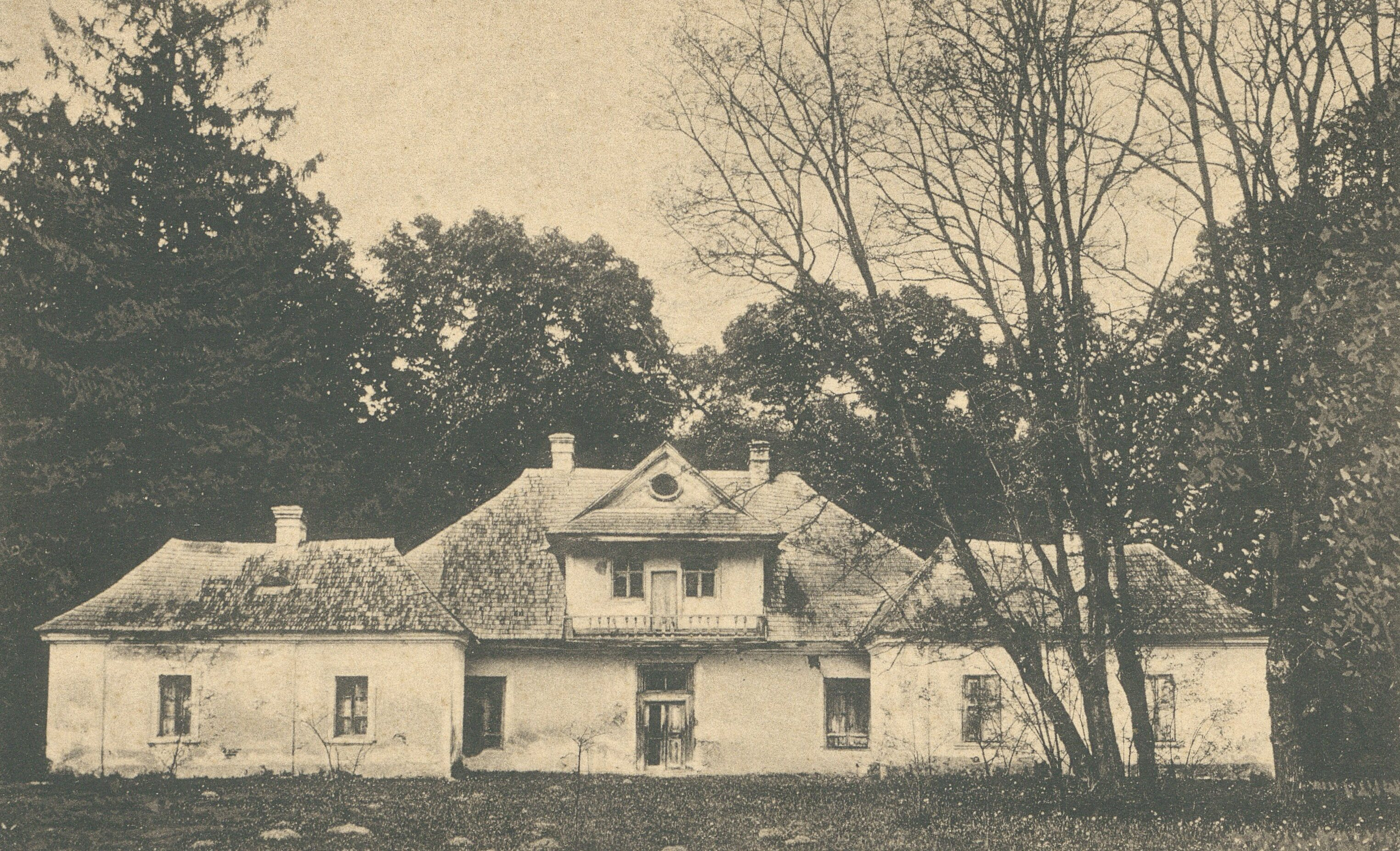
Old manor house, 1915
