= Dębowa Kłoda =

- Village
- Location within Poland
- Coordinates: 51°36′N 23°1′E
- Country: Poland
- Voivodeship: Lublin
- County: Parczew
- Gmina: Dębowa Kłoda

Dębowa Kłoda [dɛmˈbɔva ˈkwɔda] is a village in Parczew County, Lublin Voivodeship, in eastern Poland. It is the seat of the gmina (administrative district) called Gmina Dębowa Kłoda.
