= Jabłoń =

- Village
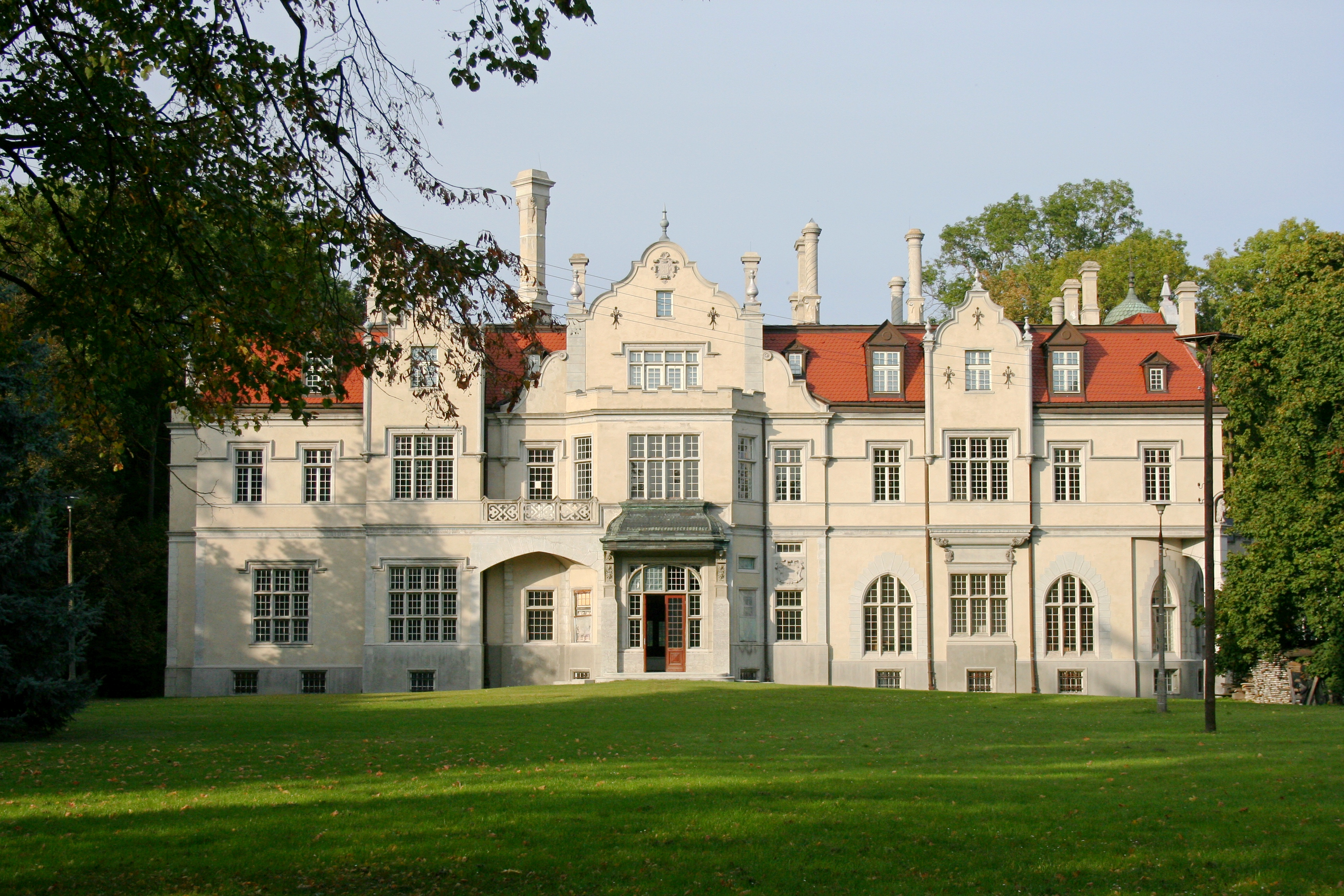
- Jabłoń Palace

- Location within Poland
- Coordinates: 51°43′N 23°5′E
- Country: Poland
- Voivodeship: Lublin
- County: Parczew
- Gmina: Jabłoń

Population
  - Total: 1,251
- Time zone: UTC+1 (CET)
  - Summer (DST): UTC+2 (CEST)
- Vehicle registration: LPA

Jabłoń [ˈjabwɔɲ] is a village in Parczew County, Lublin Voivodeship, in eastern Poland. It is the seat of the gmina (administrative district) called Gmina Jabłoń.
