= Nadzieja, Lublin Voivodeship =

Nadzieja
- Village
- Location within Poland
- Coordinates: 51°34′29″N 22°45′29″E
- Country: Poland
- Voivodeship: Lublin
- County: Parczew
- Gmina: Siemień

Nadzieja (Polish pronunciation: [naˈd͡ʑɛja]) is a village in the administrative district of Gmina Siemień, within Parczew County, Lublin Voivodeship, in eastern Poland.
