= Gmina Sosnowica =

Gmina Sosnowica Sosnowica Commune
- Gmina
- Coat of arms

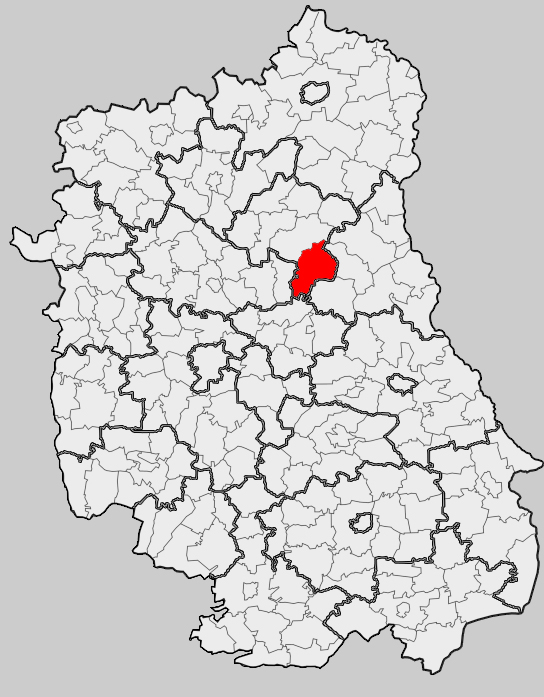
- Location within the county and voivodeship
- Coordinates (Sosnowica): 51°31′19″N 23°5′13″E
- Country: Poland
- Voivodeship: Lublin
- County: Parczew
- Seat: Sosnowica

Area
  - Total: 172.35 km^{2} (66.54 sq mi)

Population (2014)
  - Total: 2,668
  - Density: 15.48/km^{2} (40.09/sq mi)
- Website: https://www.sosnowica.pl

Gmina Sosnowica is a rural gmina (administrative district) in Parczew County, Lublin Voivodeship, in eastern Poland. Its seat is the village of Sosnowica, which lies approximately 20 kilometres (12 mi) south-east of Parczew and 48 km (30 mi) north-east of the regional capital Lublin.

The gmina covers an area of 172.35 square kilometres (66.5 sq mi), and as of 2006 its total population is 2,645 (2,668 in 2014).

== Neighbouring gminas ==
Gmina Sosnowica is bordered by the gminas of Dębowa Kłoda, Ludwin, Stary Brus, Urszulin and Uścimów.

== Villages ==
The gmina contains the following villages having the status of sołectwo: Bohutyn, Górki, Izabelin, Komarówka, Kropiwki, Lejno, Libiszów, Lipniak, Mościska, Nowy Orzechów, Olchówka, Pasieka, Pieszowola, Sosnowica, Sosnowica-Dwór, Stary Orzechów, Turno, Zienki and Zbójno.
