= Wierzchowiny, Parczew County =

Wierzchowiny
- Village
- Location within Poland
- Coordinates: 51°37′11″N 22°42′16″E
- Country: Poland
- Voivodeship: Lublin
- County: Parczew
- Gmina: Siemień

Wierzchowiny [vjɛʂxɔˈvinɨ] was a village in the administrative district of Gmina Siemień, within Parczew County, Lublin Voivodeship, in eastern Poland.

In 2016 it was delisted and split into two villages: Wierzchowiny Nowe and Wierzchowiny Stare.
