= Gmina Dębowa Kłoda =

Gmina Dębowa Kłoda Dębowa Kłoda Commune
- Gmina
- Coat of arms

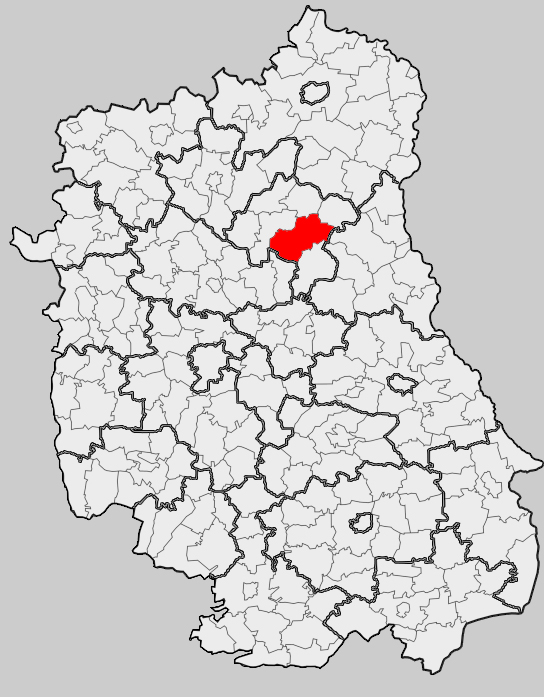
- Location within the county and voivodeship
- Coordinates (Dębowa Kłoda): 51°36′N 23°1′E
- Country: Poland
- Voivodeship: Lublin
- County: Parczew
- Seat: Dębowa Kłoda

Area
  - Total: 188.29 km^{2} (72.70 sq mi)

Population (2014)
  - Total: 3,968
  - Density: 21.07/km^{2} (54.58/sq mi)

Gmina Dębowa Kłoda is a rural gmina (administrative district) in Parczew County, Lublin Voivodeship, in eastern Poland. Its seat is the village of Dębowa Kłoda, which lies approximately 12 kilometres (7 mi) east of Parczew and 50 km (31 mi) north-east of the regional capital Lublin.

The gmina covers an area of 188.29 square kilometres (72.7 sq mi), and as of 2006 its total population is 3,991 (3,968 in 2014).

== Neighbouring gminas ==
Gmina Dębowa Kłoda is bordered by the gminas of Jabłoń, Parczew, Podedwórze, Sosnowica, Stary Brus, Uścimów and Wyryki.

== Villages ==
The gmina contains the following villages having the status of sołectwo: Bednarzówka, Białka, Chmielów, Dębowa Kłoda, Hanów, Kodeniec, Korona, Leitnie, Lubiczyn, Makoszka, Marianówka, Nietiahy, Pachole, Plebania Wola, Stępków, Uhnin, Wyhalew, Zadębie and Żmiarki.
