= Kodeniec =

- Village
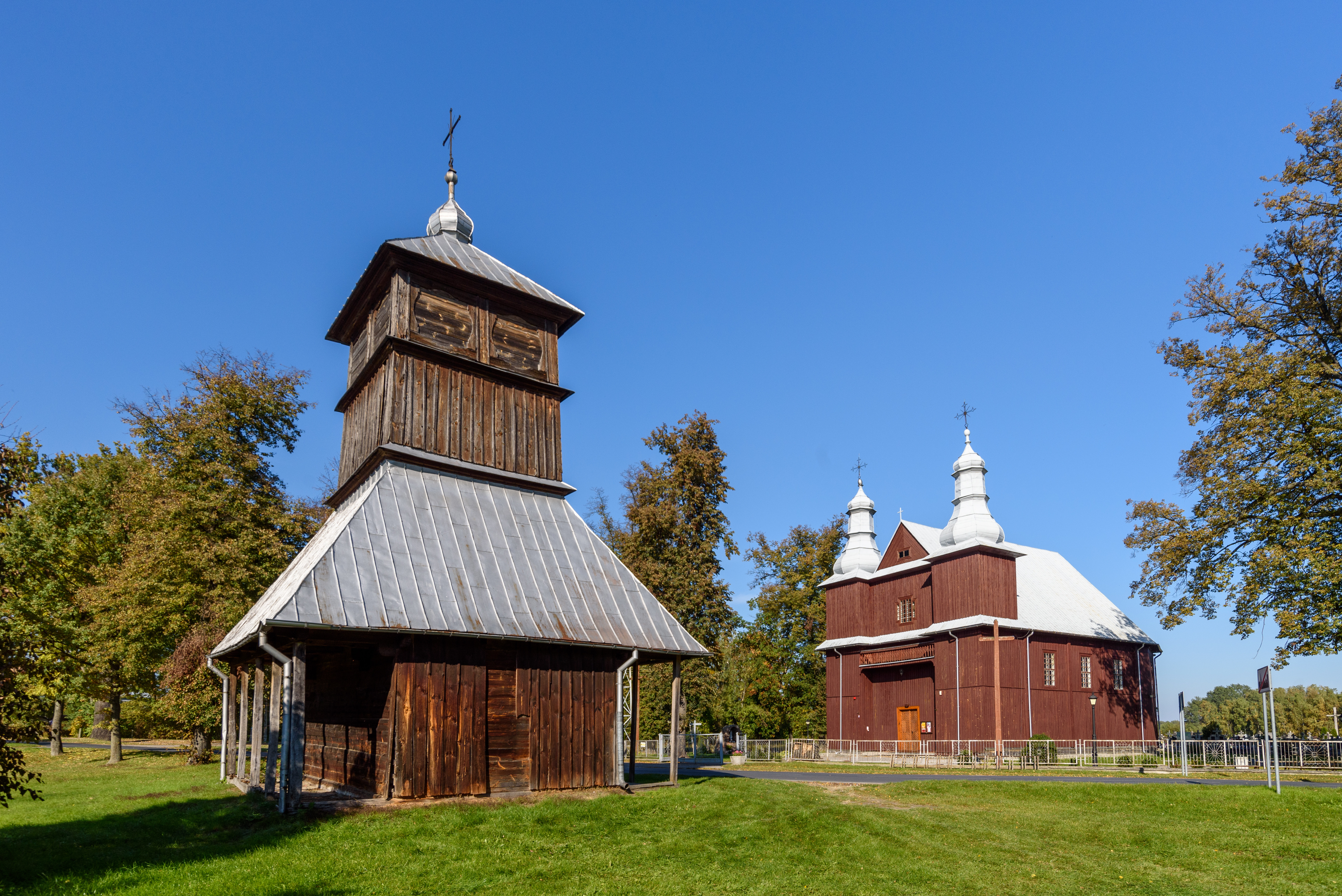
- Old wooden church of the Nativity of Virgin Mary

- Location within Poland
- Coordinates: 51°36′28″N 23°7′32″E
- Country: Poland
- Voivodeship: Lublin
- County: Parczew
- Gmina: Dębowa Kłoda
- Time zone: UTC+1 (CET)
  - Summer (DST): UTC+2 (CEST)
- Vehicle registration: LPA

Kodeniec [kɔˈdɛɲɛt͡s] is a village in the administrative district of Gmina Dębowa Kłoda, within Parczew County, Lublin Voivodeship, in eastern Poland.
