= Olchówka, Lublin Voivodeship =

Olchówka
- Village
- Location within Poland
- Coordinates: 51°33′25″N 23°6′39″E
- Country: Poland
- Voivodeship: Lublin
- County: Parczew
- Gmina: Sosnowica

Olchówka [ɔlˈxufka] is a village in the administrative district of Gmina Sosnowica, within Parczew County, Lublin Voivodeship, in eastern Poland.
