= Augustówka, Lublin Voivodeship =

Augustówka
- Village
- Location within Poland
- Coordinates: 51°39′38″N 22°48′39″E
- Country: Poland
- Voivodeship: Lublin
- County: Parczew
- Gmina: Siemień
- Population (approx.): 100

Augustówka [auɡusˈtufka] is a village in the administrative district of Gmina Siemień, within Parczew County, Lublin Voivodeship, in eastern Poland.
