= Juliopol, Lublin Voivodeship =

Juliopol
- Village
- Location within Poland
- Coordinates: 51°35′26″N 22°42′25″E
- Country: Poland
- Voivodeship: Lublin
- County: Parczew
- Gmina: Siemień

Juliopol [juˈljɔpɔl] is a village in the administrative district of Gmina Siemień, within Parczew County, Lublin Voivodeship, in eastern Poland.
