= Sts. Apostles Peter and Paul Church (Sosnowica) =

Orthodox church in Sosnowica, Poland

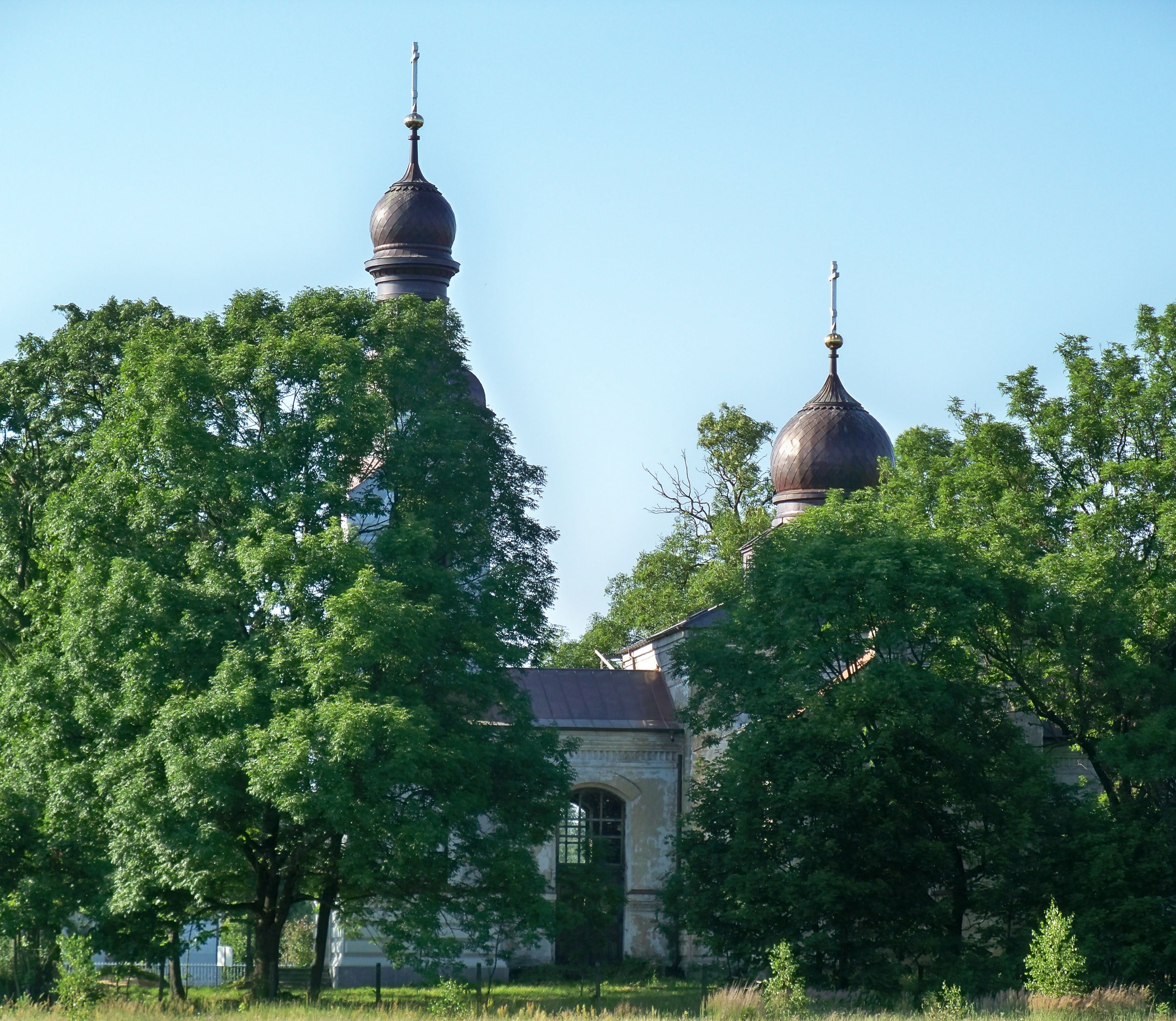
- Church before the renovation
- Sts. Apostles Peter and Paul Church
- 51°31′19.0″N 23°04′50.2″E
- Location: Sosnowica
- Country: Poland
- Denomination: Eastern Orthodoxy
- Churchmanship: Polish Orthodox Church

History
- Status: active Orthodox church
- Dedication: Saints Peter and Paul
- Dedicated: 1 May 1894

Architecture
- Architect: Viktor Syczugov
- Style: Russian Revival
- Completed: 1893

Specifications
- Materials: brick

Administration
- Diocese: Diocese of Lublin and Chełm

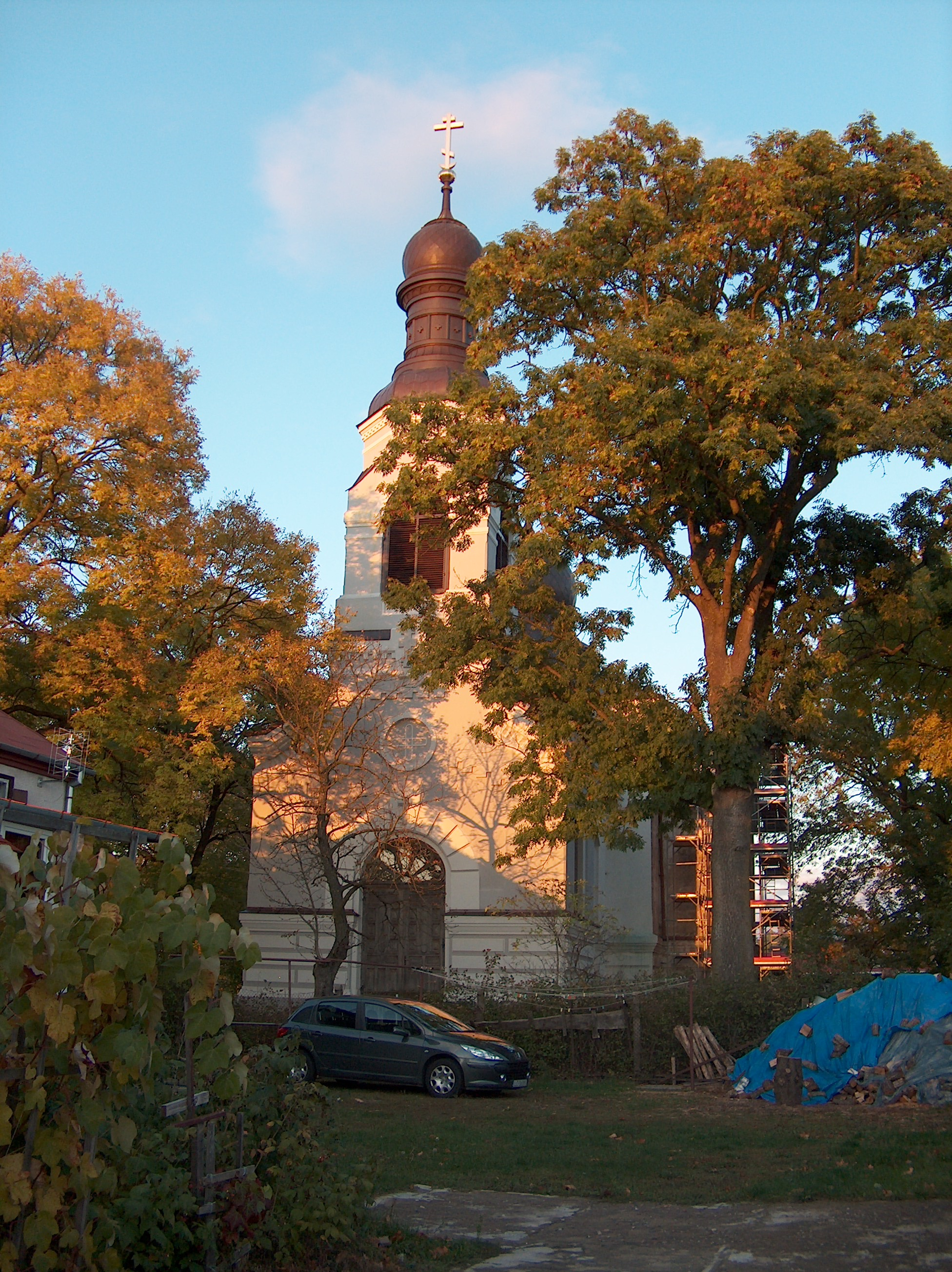
Facade of the church

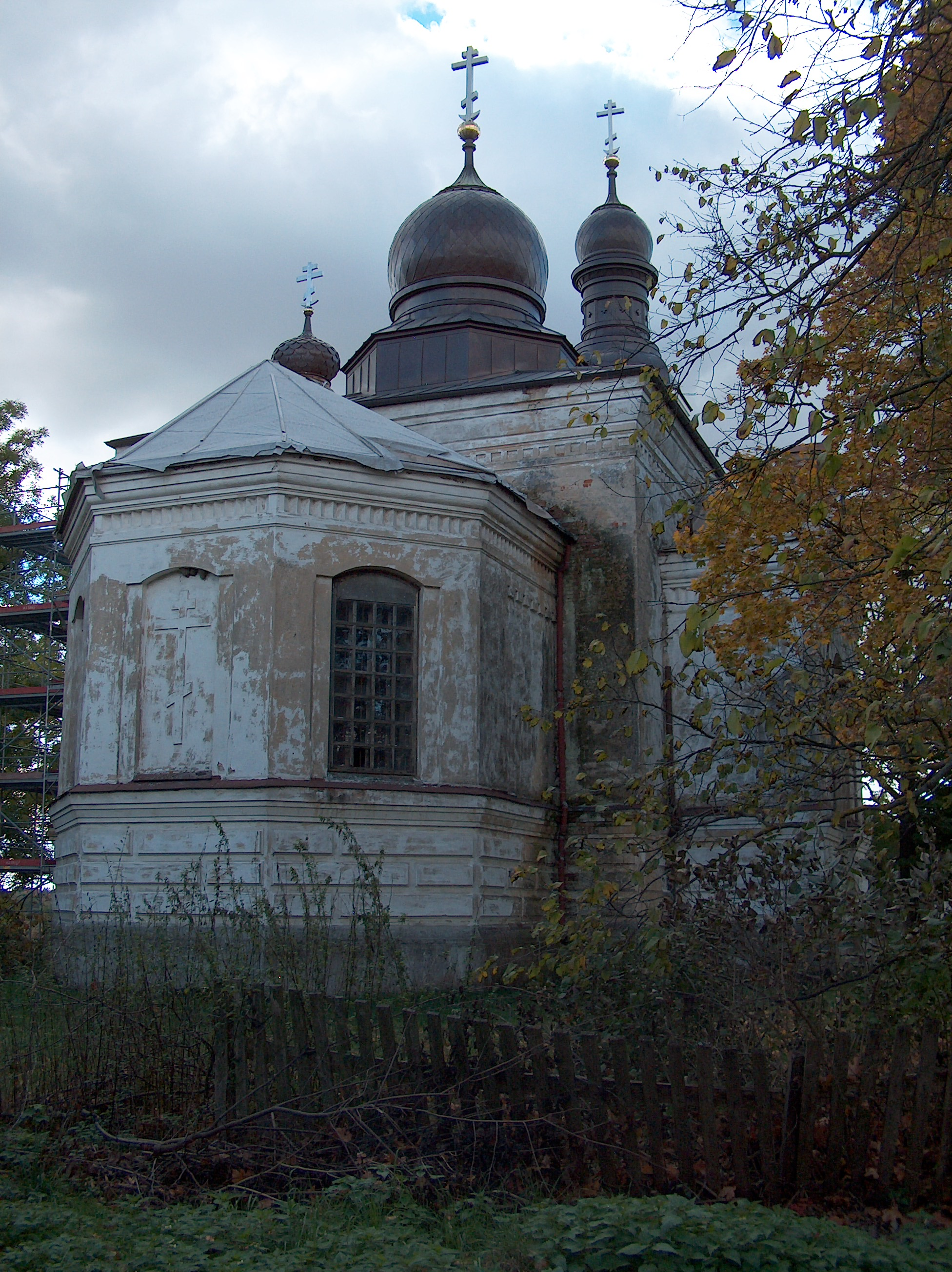
View from the side of the chancel

The Sts. Apostles Peter and Paul Church is an Eastern Orthodox filial church in Sosnowica. It belongs to the Parish of the Exaltation of the Holy Cross in Horostyta, in the Chełm Deanery of the Diocese of Lublin and Chełm of the Polish Orthodox Church.

The first Orthodox church in Sosnowica was built between 1522 and 1544, but it was destroyed within the same century. In 1598, an Uniate church was established there. It served as the parish center until 1890, when it was moved to the local cemetery due to its poor condition. The new church, designed by Viktor Syczugov in the Russian Revival style, was built between 1891 and 1894. By this time, the parish had converted to Orthodoxy, following the Conversion of Chełm Eparchy in 1875. The church served as the parish center from 1894 to 1946, with a break between 1915 and 1919 when the local Orthodox population was displaced. After the deportations of the Orthodox Ukrainian population as part of the resettlements to the Soviet Union and Operation Vistula, the church was abandoned and repurposed as a warehouse. Most of its historic furnishings were destroyed at that time. After 1989, the building was restored for liturgical use as a filial church. The Divine Liturgy is celebrated once a year on the feast day of the patron saints.

The church is located in the central part of the village, along the main road – the highway from Lublin, west of the market square. Approximately 150 meters from the church is the historic, active Orthodox cemetery.

== History ==
=== First churches in Sosnowica ===
The Orthodox parish in Sosnowica was established in the first half of the 15th century. It belonged to the Chełm Deanery of the Chełm Diocese. According to G. Pelica, the first church in the village, dedicated to the Intercession of the Theotokos, was built between 1522 and 1544. A. Wawryniuk and M. Gołoś state that a free-standing Orthodox church existed in Sosnowica as early as 1468. This building ceased to exist within the same century. A new church was constructed on its site in 1598. It was an Uniate church, as Dionysius Zbyruyskyy, the last Orthodox bishop of Chełm under the jurisdiction of the Patriarchate of Constantinople, had joined the Uniate Church. This decision was applied to the entire administration, although not all pastoral institutions agreed to it. The church was made of wood. The building was accompanied by a belfry and two cemeteries. In 1717, the church in Sosnowica is mentioned as the seat of the Uniate parish under the Chełm Deanery of the Eparchy of Chełm–Belz.

The church, built at the end of the 16th century, still existed in the 1870s, although by this time its technical condition was already very poor. In 1875, due to the Conversion of Chełm Eparchy, the church came under the ownership of the Russian Orthodox Church. At that time, it served a parish with varying estimates of parishioners, ranging from 1,862 to as many as 2,420. Although, in the period immediately preceding the dissolution of the union in Chełm, the parishioners of Sosnowica were among those protesting against the forced conversion to Orthodoxy, the church changed ownership without any active opposition from the local population after the parson, Father Michał Somik, converted to Orthodoxy. A certain group of Uniates, strongly opposed to Orthodoxy, continued to use the services of the local Roman Catholic priest, who had to leave Sosnowica in 1876. In 1905, after the issuance of the tolerance decree, 27 people in Sosnowica, a small minority of the entire parish, took advantage of the right to return to the Catholic faith (in the Latin Rite).

In 1890, due to the poor technical condition of the Intercession of the Theotokos Church and the poverty of its furnishings, it was decided to restore the building and move it to the parish cemetery. A new sacred building, dedicated to Saints Peter and Paul, was to take on the functions of the parish church. The construction of the new church was financed from a state fund designated for the construction of new churches. When the 16th-century church was moved to the cemetery, the following historic items were in the church: a bell from 1544, an eight-armed priest's cross, a smaller cross, and a fragment of royal doors. The wooden cemetery church survived until the early 21st century in a ruined state.

=== Construction and functioning of the Saints Peter and Paul Church ===
The ceremony of laying the foundation stone for the new church took place on 14 July 1891. The antimens for the church was donated by the Chełm and Warsaw Bishop Flavian. Construction work lasted for three years, and the church was dedicated by the Lublin Bishop Gedeon on 1 May 1894. The construction was carried out by the Moczanowa construction company from Daugavpils. The building required partial repairs only a few years after it was put into liturgical use and underwent partial renovations in 1906 and between 1908 and 1910.

Five years after the last renovation, in July 1915, the Orthodox residents of Sosnowica were evacuated to the east. The church remained inactive until April 1918, when the first group of evacuees returned to their hometown. From the beginning of 1919, the duties of the parson were carried out by hieromonk Mitrofan Stelmaszuk from the St. Onuphrius Monastery in Jabłeczna, who also served the Church of St. Nicholas in Dratów. Despite the actual reopening of the church, the Ministry of Religious Affairs and Public Education did not plan to recognize it as the seat of a permanent parish in 1919. However, this decision had to be changed, as by 1923 the church in Sosnowica was one of the eight active Orthodox churches in the Włodawa County and the seat of one of the seven parishes in the Włodawa Deanery of the Diocese of Warsaw and Chełm. In 1921, the church served a community of 127 local Orthodox believers. By 1923, it had once again become the seat of the parish, one of the 15 Orthodox pastoral centers in the Chełm Deanery of the Diocese of Warsaw and Chełm.

As part of the deportations of the Ukrainian population to the Soviet Union and the subsequent Operation Vistula, all 500 Orthodox believers living in Sosnowica had to leave the village. The abandoned church served as a communal warehouse in the 1950s. Its furnishings were completely destroyed during this period. Nevertheless, in 1963, Father Piotr Kosacki, the priest of the Lublin parish, made an attempt to restore the church to liturgical use, illegally holding a service for which he was banned from performing duties throughout the entire county. The Polish Orthodox Church was granted permission to restore the church in Sosnowica to its original functions in 1966. However, in the 1970s, only protective work was done to prevent the church from falling into complete ruin. The building was only fully restored in the 1990s, with roof and door frame repairs. Renovations were delayed due to a lack of necessary funds.

From the establishment of the Diocese of Lublin and Chełm in 1989 until 2003, the church in Sosnowica was a branch of the Cathedral of the Transfiguration in Lublin, and in 2003 it became a filial church of the parish in Horostyta. However, it remained inactive until 1997. Since that year, one Holy Liturgy has been celebrated annually on the patronal feast day (12 July).

In 2012, the next phase of renovations took place, which included repainting the church's façade, replacing window frames in the belfry, and renewing the roof covering. The investment was co-financed by the Ministry of Culture and National Heritage. Due to the small number of Orthodox believers residing in Sosnowica, the church grounds are often littered, and its fence has been vandalized. In 2018, after the completion of comprehensive repairs, Archbishop Abel of Lublin and Chełm performed the re-dedication of the church. In June 2019, a cross was unveiled next to the church to commemorate Hegumen Mitrofan Budźka, who took care of the Sosnowica church in the 1970s.

== Architecture ==
Grzegorz Jacek Pelica identifies Viktor Syczugov as the architect of the church in Sosnowica. This architect designed 11 church plans for the Diocese of Warsaw and Chełm. However, Paulina Cynalewska-Kuczma considers Syczugov's authorship uncertain, though highly probable due to clear similarities between certain elements of the church in Sosnowica and those in Chłopków and Kosyń, which were certainly built according to his designs. Bronisław Seniuk also attributes the Sosnowica church to Syczugov.

The church in Sosnowica is built on a cross-shaped plan. It is a single-nave structure; the nave has a rectangular shape and is covered with a four-pitched roof, topped with an onion dome on an octagonal tholobate. The lower arms of the cross extend outward as avant-corps, also rectangular in shape, with gable roofs. The church porch is likewise rectangular and covered with a gable roof. The chancel is polygonally closed. The church's bell tower is located above the church porch at the front of the building, also crowned with an onion dome on a cylindrical tholobate. The exterior features decorative window frames and various friezes, including stepped, cubical, and diagonally arranged brick patterns. The entire structure represents the Russian Revival style with classical elements.

=== Interior and furnishings ===
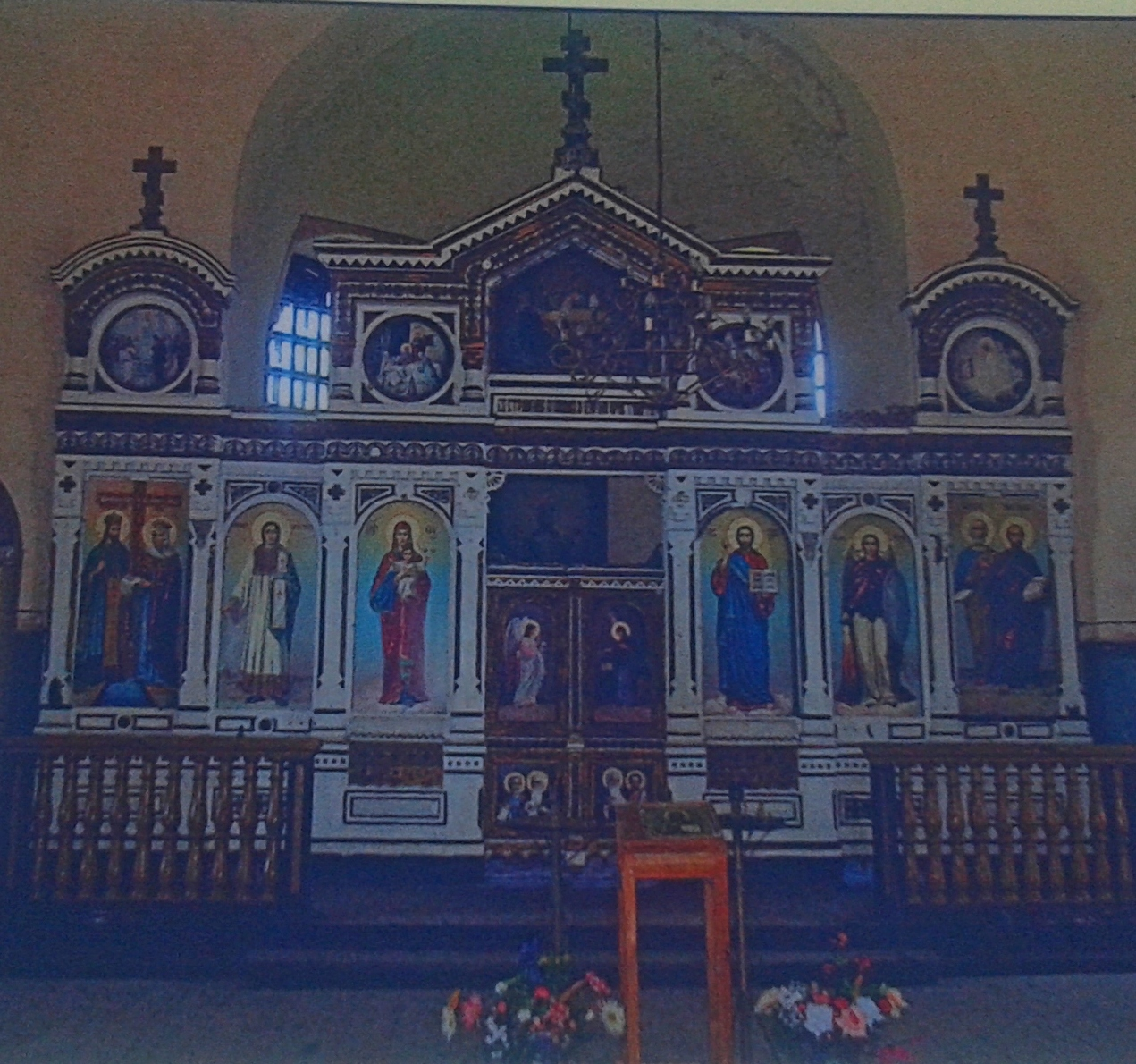
Iconostasis in the church

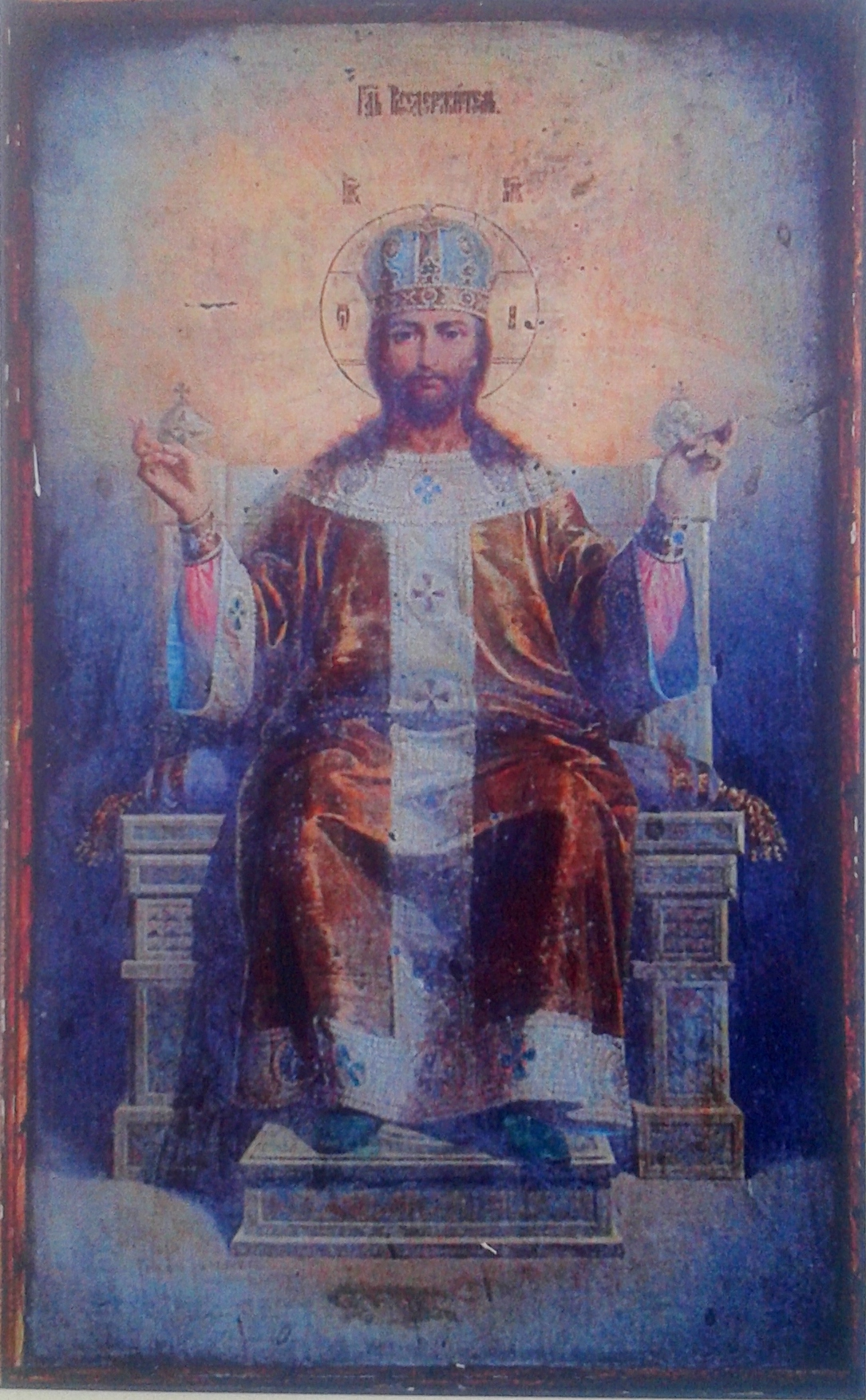
Icon of Christ Pantocrator from the church

The iconostasis in the church in Sosnowica dates back to the 19th century and consists of 15 icons arranged in two rows. The lower row contains 10 icons, including four on the royal doors. From the left, these depict St. Helena and St. Constantine, St. Stephen, the Mother of God, Christ Pantocrator, St. Michael the Archangel, and the church's patrons, Saints Peter and Paul. The upper row features four icons: The Last Supper, The Nativity of the Mother of God, The Dormition of the Mother of God, and The Resurrection of Christ. The icon of the Last Supper was transferred from the iconostasis of the previous church in Sosnowica. The entire iconostasis follows the Russian ecclesiastical art style of the second half of the 19th century. Additionally, side icon cases in the church display icons of St. Vladimir and St. Olga, as well as Saints Cyril and Methodius. These icon cases were donated to the local parish by the future saint, John of Kronstadt.

Among the surviving icons venerated in the church, depictions of Jesus Christ and St. Stephen are preserved. As of 2012, these are exhibited in the Polesian National Park in Urszulin. The icons were stolen in the 1990s and later recovered at the Polish-Ukrainian border. The thieves had also taken other icons, which were subsequently destroyed. Although some frescoes in the church's interior have partially survived, other liturgical items such as vessels, vestments, and smaller icons were lost. Currently, these are brought from the church in Horostyta before the annual patronal feast.

The church was listed as a historical monument on 2 May 1988 under registry number A/144/50.
