= Parczew County =

Parczew County Powiat parczewski
- County
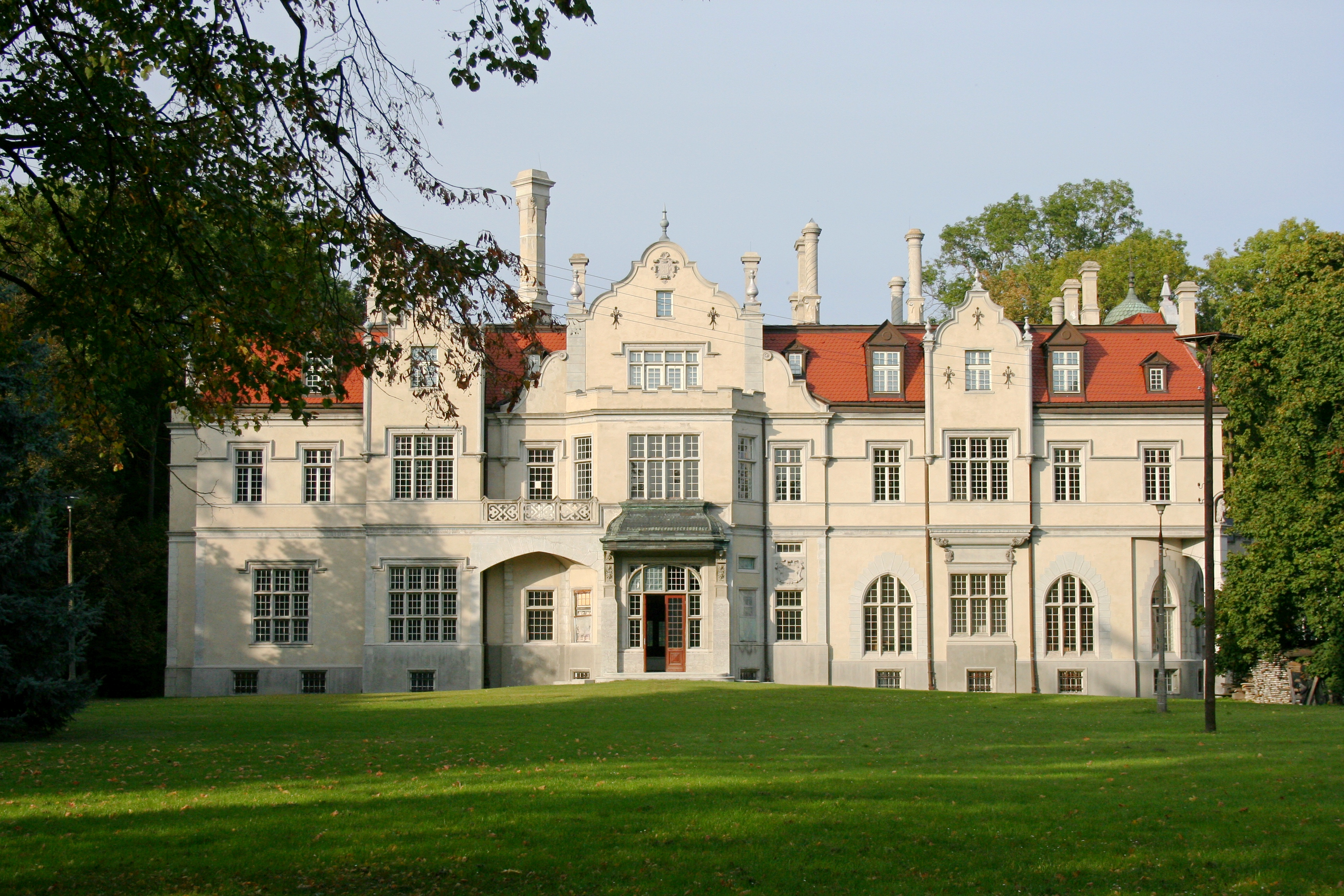
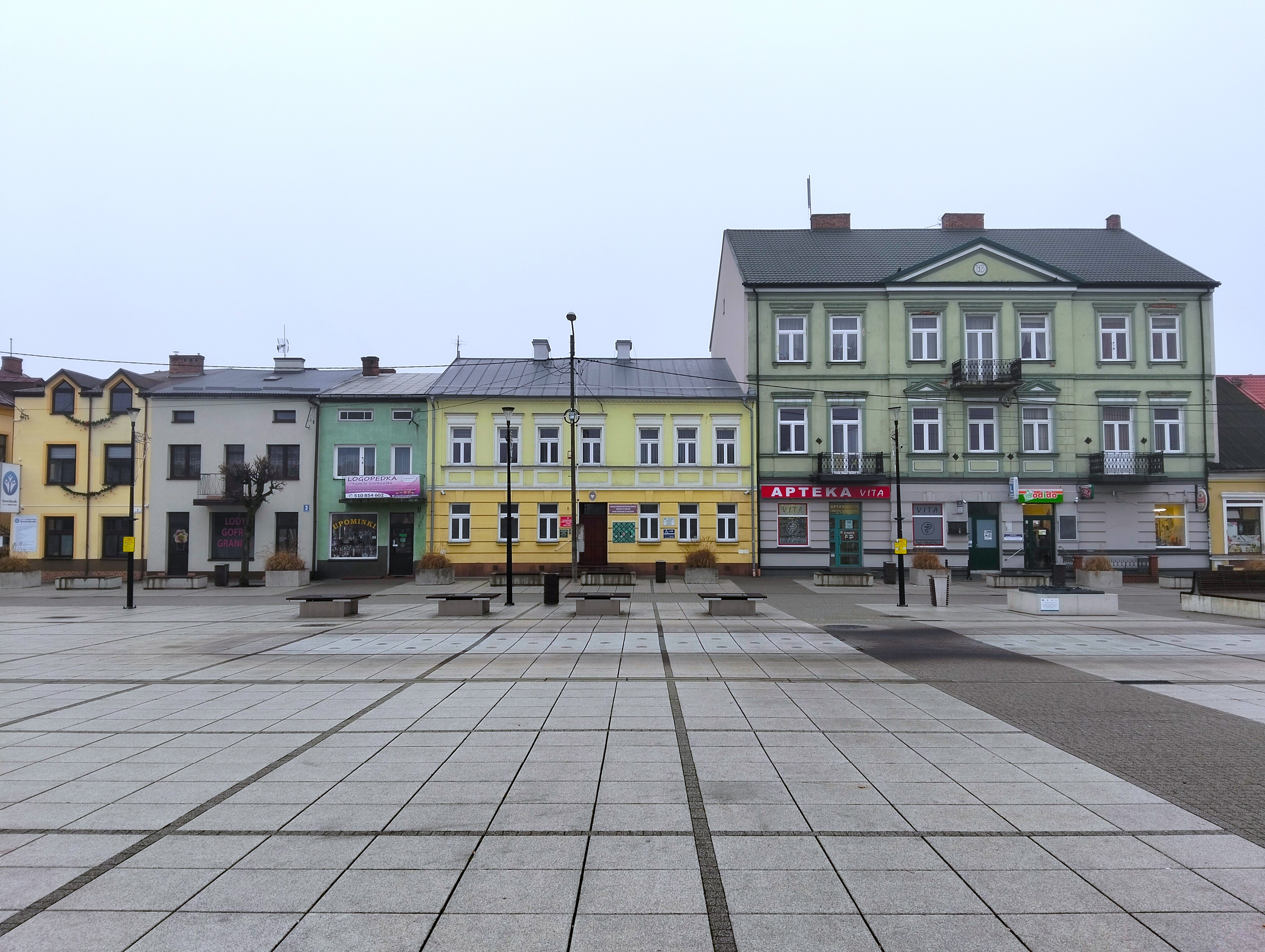
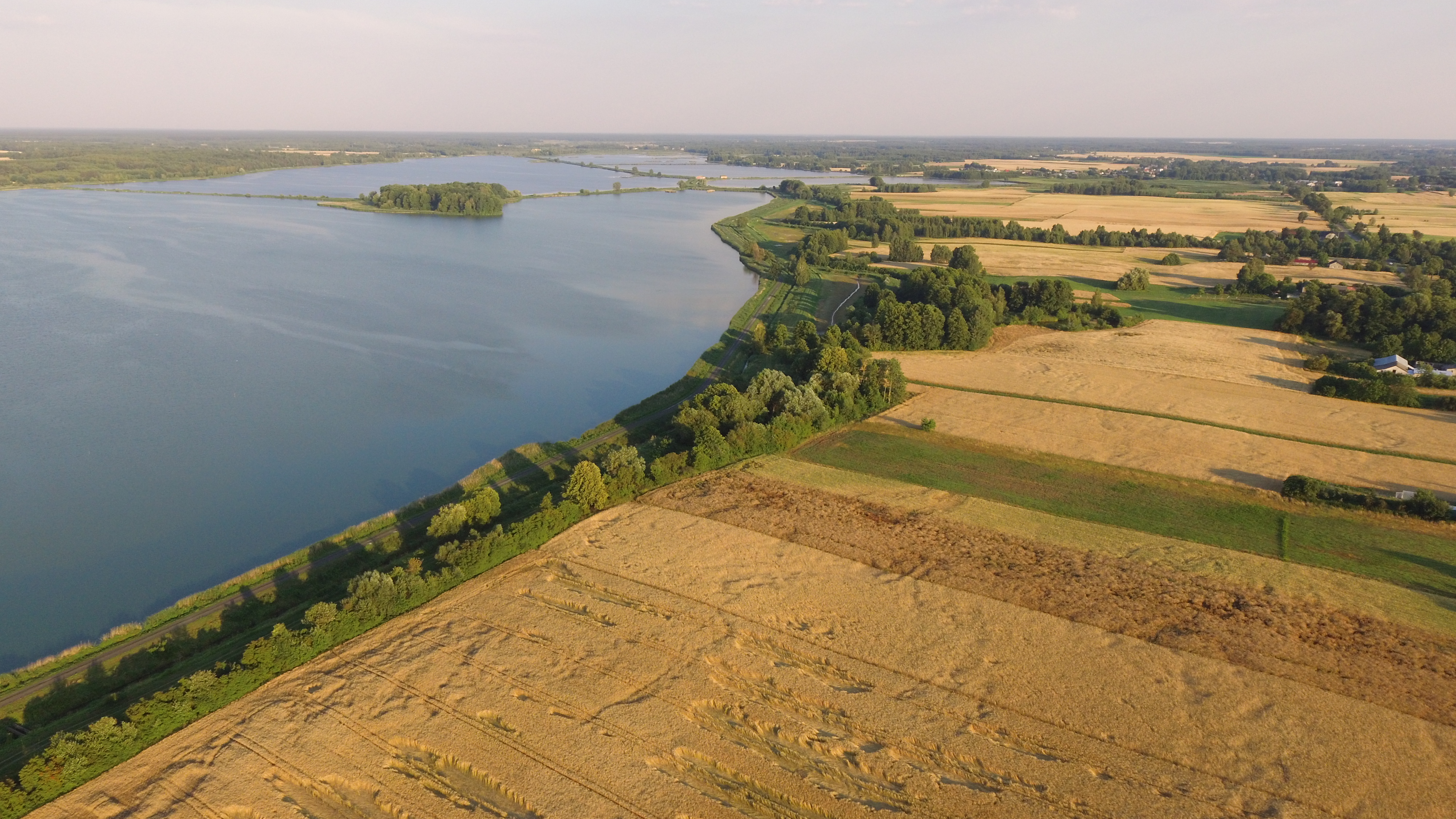
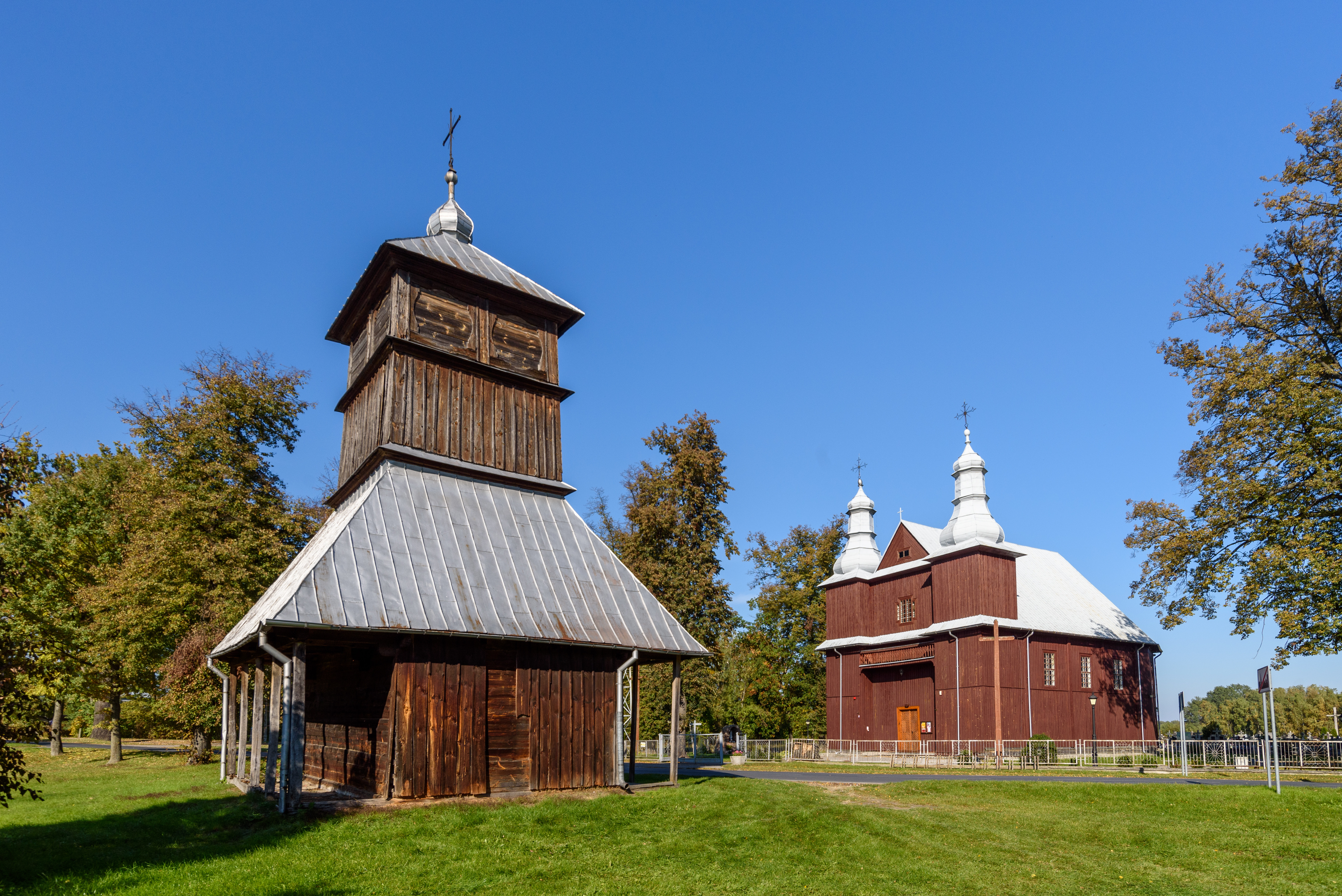
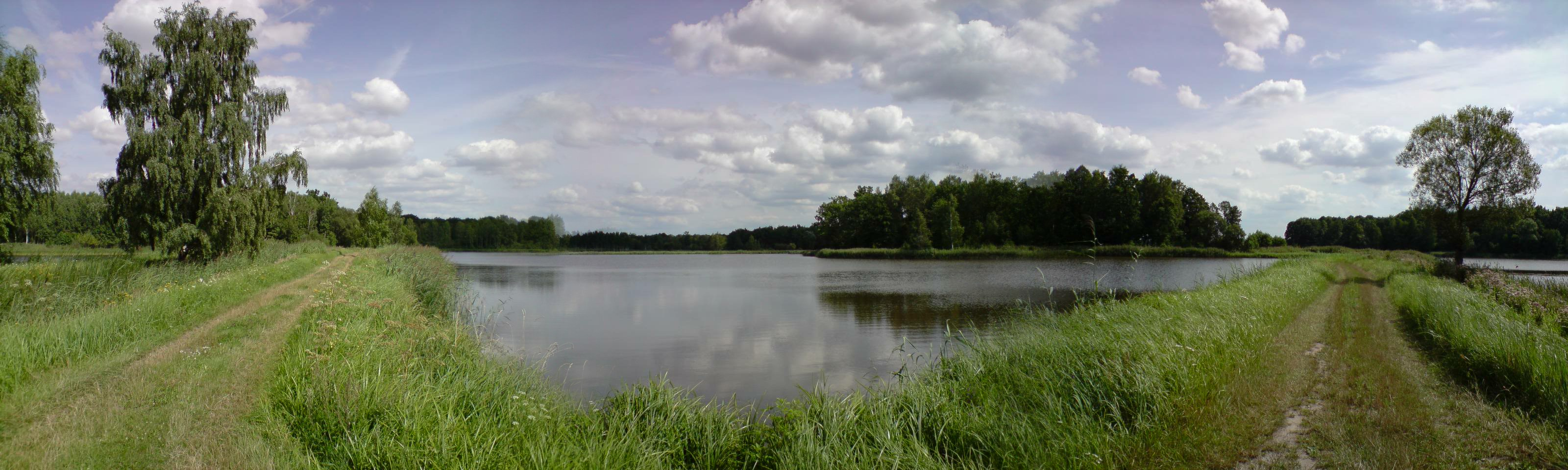
- Zamoyski Palace in Jabłoń Market Square in Parczew Countryside in Siemień Old wooden church in Kodeniec Pond in Pohulanka

- Flag Coat of arms

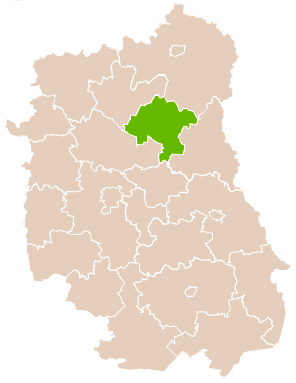
- Location within the voivodeship
- Coordinates (Parczew): 51°38′N 22°52′E
- Country: Poland
- Voivodeship: Lublin
- Seat: Parczew
- Gminas: Total 7: Gmina Dębowa Kłoda; Gmina Jabłoń; Gmina Milanów; Gmina Parczew; Gmina Podedwórze; Gmina Siemień; Gmina Sosnowica

Area
  - Total: 952.62 km^{2} (367.81 sq mi)

Population (2019)
  - Total: 34,809
  - Density: 36.540/km^{2} (94.639/sq mi)
  - Urban: 10,602
  - Rural: 24,207
- Time zone: UTC+1 (CET)
  - Summer (DST): UTC+2 (CEST)
- Car plates: LPA
- Website: www.parczew.pl

Parczew County (Polish: powiat parczewski) is a unit of territorial administration and local government (powiat) in Lublin Voivodeship, eastern Poland. It was established on January 1, 1999, as a result of the Polish local government reforms passed in 1998. Its administrative seat and only town is Parczew, which lies 48 kilometres (30 mi) north-east of the regional capital Lublin.

The county covers an area of 952.62 square kilometres (367.8 sq mi). As of 2006, its total population is 34,809, including 10,602 in Parczew and a rural population of 24,207.

== Neighbouring counties ==
Parczew County is bordered by Biała County to the north, Włodawa County to the east, Łęczna County to the south, Lubartów County to the south-west and Radzyń County to the north-west.

== Administrative divisions ==
The county is subdivided into seven gminas (one urban-rural and six rural). These are listed in the following table, in descending order of population.

Gmina	Type	Area (km^{2})	Population (2019)	Seat
Gmina Parczew	urban-rural	146.2	14,410	Parczew
Gmina Siemień	rural	110.9	4,555	Siemień
Gmina Dębowa Kłoda	rural	188.3	3,963	Dębowa Kłoda
Gmina Jabłoń	rural	111.0	3,848	Jabłoń
Gmina Milanów	rural	116.6	3,805	Milanów
Gmina Sosnowica	rural	172.4	2,601	Sosnowica
Gmina Podedwórze	rural	107.2	1,627	Podedwórze
