= Milanów =

Milanów may refer to the following places:

- Milanów, Lublin Voivodeship (east Poland)
- Milanów, Garwolin County in Masovian Voivodeship (east-central Poland)
- Milanów, Grójec County in Masovian Voivodeship (east-central Poland)
- Gmina Milanów (east Poland)
- Milanów, former name for Old Wilanów, Warsaw, Poland, used until the 16th century
