= Wygoda railway station =

Railway station in Garwolin County, Poland

Wygoda

General information
- Location: Grabniak, Sobolew, Garwolin, Masovian; Poland
- Coordinates: 51.7014675°N 21.7213363°E
- System: Rail Station
- Owner: Polskie Koleje Państwowe S.A.

Services
Preceding station	Masovian Railways	Following station
Sobolew towards Warszawa Zachodnia	R7	Mika towards Dęblin
Location

Wygoda railway station is a railway station at Grabniakw, Garwolin, Masovian, Poland. It is served by Masovian Railways.
