= Sobolew railway station =

Railway station in Masovian Voivodeship, Poland

Sobolew
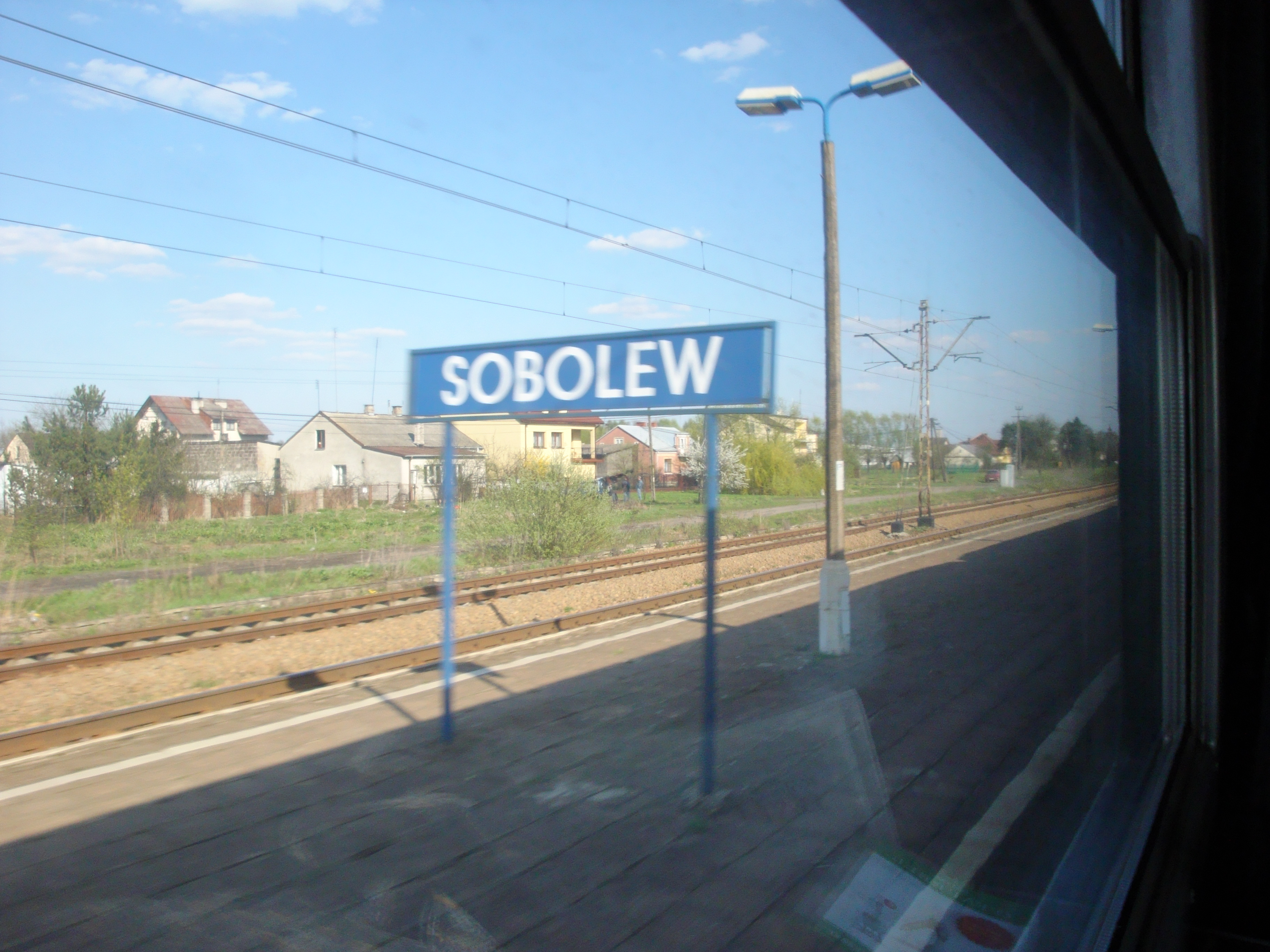

General information
- Location: Sobolew, Sobolew, Garwolin, Masovian; Poland
- Coordinates: 51.7416197°N 21.6731477°E
- System: Rail Station
- Owner: Polskie Koleje Państwowe S.A.

Services
Preceding station	Masovian Railways	Following station
Leokadia towards Warszawa Zachodnia	R7	Wygoda towards Dęblin
Location

Sobolew railway station is a railway station at Sobolew, Garwolin, Masovian, Poland. It is served by Masovian Railways.
