= Leokadia railway station =

Railway station in Masovian Voivodeship, Poland

Leokadia

General information
- Location: Leokadia, Łaskarzew, Garwolin, Masovian; Poland
- Coordinates: 51.7672841°N 21.6329441°E
- System: Rail Station
- Owner: Polskie Koleje Państwowe S.A.

Services
Preceding station	Masovian Railways	Following station
Łaskarzew Przystanek towards Warszawa Zachodnia	R7	Sobolew towards Dęblin
Location

Leokadia railway station is a railway station at Leokadia, Garwolin, Masovian, Poland. It is served by Masovian Railways.
