= Poręby =

Poręby may refer to the following places in Poland:

- Poręby, Lower Silesian Voivodeship (south-west Poland)
- Poręby, Lublin Voivodeship (east Poland)
- Poręby, Podlaskie Voivodeship (north-east Poland)
- Poręby, Gmina Bełchatów in Łódź Voivodeship (central Poland)
- Poręby, Opoczno County in Łódź Voivodeship (central Poland)
- Poręby, Wieluń County in Łódź Voivodeship (central Poland)
- Poręby, Zduńska Wola County in Łódź Voivodeship (central Poland)
- Poręby, Subcarpathian Voivodeship (south-east Poland)
- Poręby, Sanok County in Subcarpathian Voivodeship (south-east Poland)
- Poręby, Garwolin County in Masovian Voivodeship (east-central Poland)
- Poręby, Mińsk County in Masovian Voivodeship (east-central Poland)
- Poręby, Otwock County in Masovian Voivodeship (east-central Poland)
- Poręby, Greater Poland Voivodeship (west-central Poland)
- Poręby, Pomeranian Voivodeship (north Poland)
- Poręby, Warmian-Masurian Voivodeship (north Poland)
