= Gończyce =

- Village
- Location within Poland
- Coordinates: 51°47′N 21°44′E
- Country: Poland
- Voivodeship: Masovian
- County: Garwolin
- Gmina: Sobolew
- Population: 840

Gończyce [ɡɔɲˈt͡ʂɨt͡sɛ] is a village in the administrative district of Gmina Sobolew, within Garwolin County, Masovian Voivodeship, in east-central Poland.

== Transport ==
The S17 expressway bypasses Gończyce to the east. Exit 12 of the expressway provides quick access to Lublin and to Warsaw.

Vovoideship road 807 passes through the village.

The nearest railway station is in Sobolew.
