= Zdzisław Jasiński =

Polish painter, draftsman and watercolorist

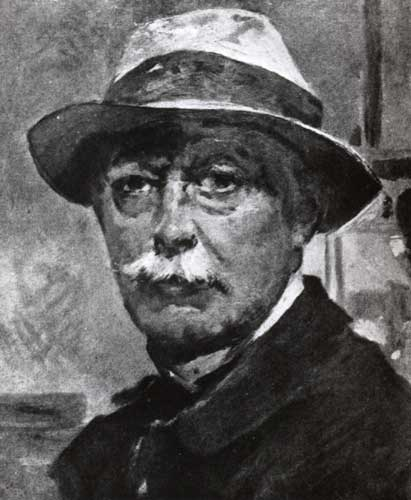
Self-portrait (1922)

Zdzisław Piotr Jasiński (18 January 1863 –18 November 1932) was a Polish painter, draftsman and watercolorist. His first paintings were in the Academic style, but his later, more well-known works were more Impressionistic.

== Biography ==
He was born in Warsaw (then part of Congress Poland). His father owned a decorating business and was an elder in the painter's guild. His youngest brother, Józef (1876–1954), became a sculptor.

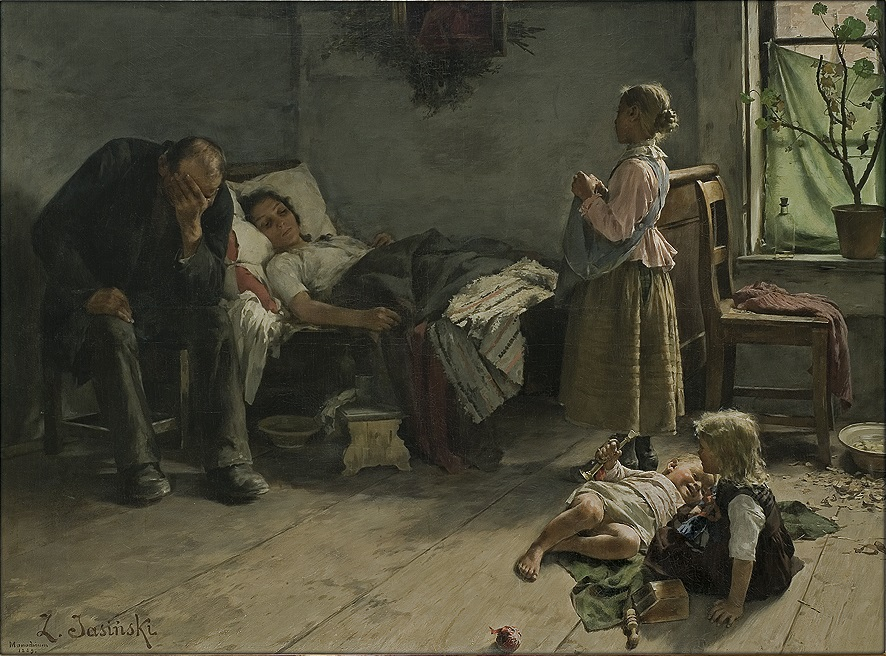
The Sick Mother

He began his studies with Wojciech Gerson at the Warsaw School of Drawing (now part of the Academy of Fine Arts in Warsaw). After finishing there, he moved to Kraków, where he studied at the Academy of Fine Arts under Leopold Loeffler and Florian Cynk. Thanks to a scholarship from the "Towarzystwo Zachęty Sztuk Pięknych" (Society for the Encouragement of Fine Arts) he was able to study at the Academy of Fine Arts, Munich, where he was a pupil of Otto Seitz and Alexander von Wagner.

In 1891, he received a gold medal for his painting The Sick Mother at a major exhibition in Berlin. Two years later, he won a medal at the World's Columbian Exposition.

After 1893, he lived in Warsaw. From 1896 to 1897, he painted murals in Saint Petersburg and Moscow. He also did murals at the cathedral in Włocławek and the college in Kalisz. In 1897, he spent some time in Rome, creating ceiling paintings. Four years later, he painted the scene Folk Music on the ceiling of the Warsaw Philharmonic concert hall, which was destroyed by a German bombing in 1939.

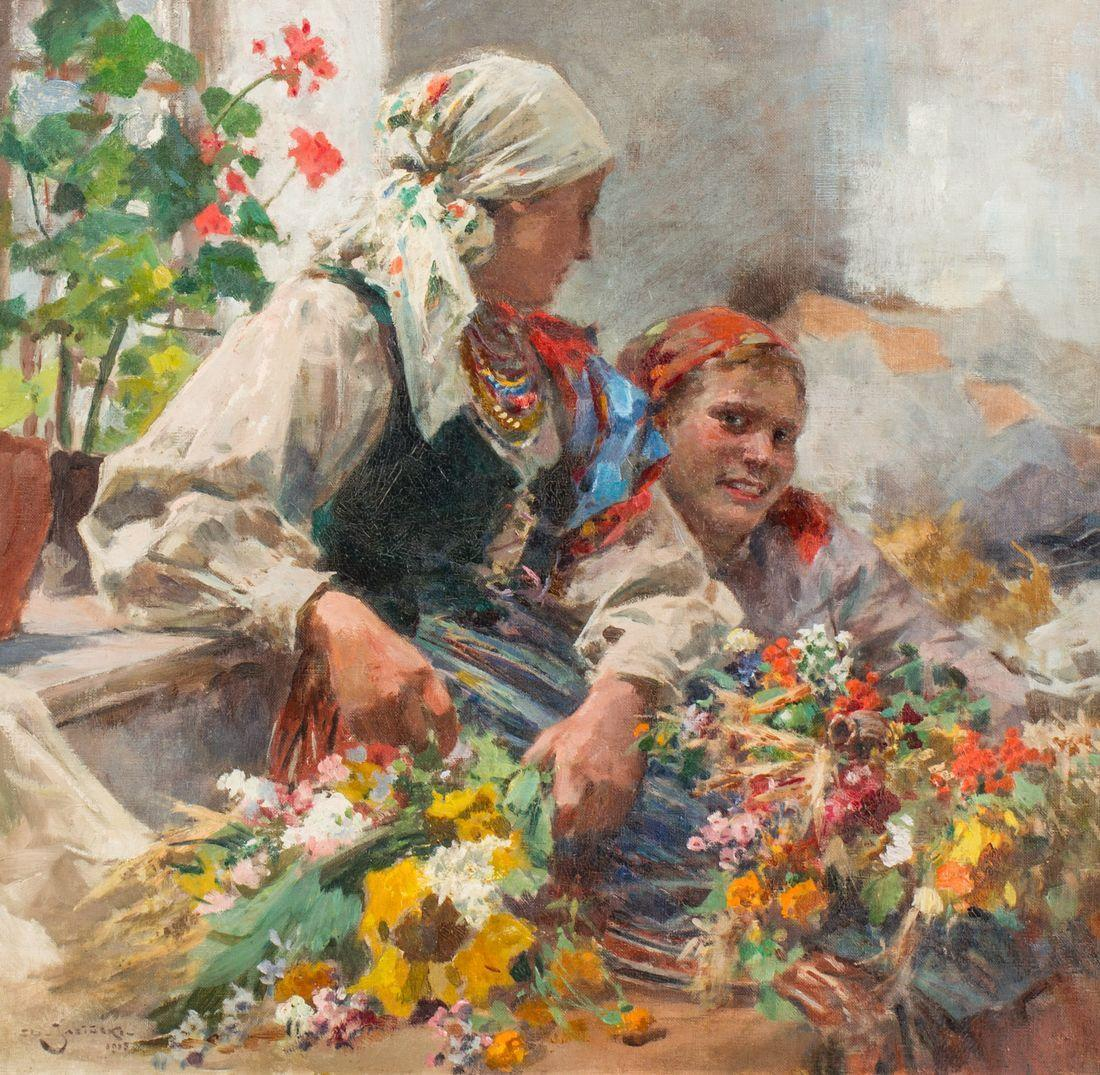
The Florists

In 1904, he moved to an estate near Przyłęk. He returned to Warsaw in 1910, however, and built a town house. Shortly after, he painted a fresco of Saint John the Evangelist at the nearby St. Barbara's Church, which was destroyed during World War II. In 1921 he was one of the co-founders of the group "Pro Arte", which was opposed to the abstract trends of modern art. Jasiński died on 18 November 1932 in Warsaw.
