= Church of St. Nicholas, Dratów =

Orthodox church in Dratów, Poland

Church of St. Nicholas
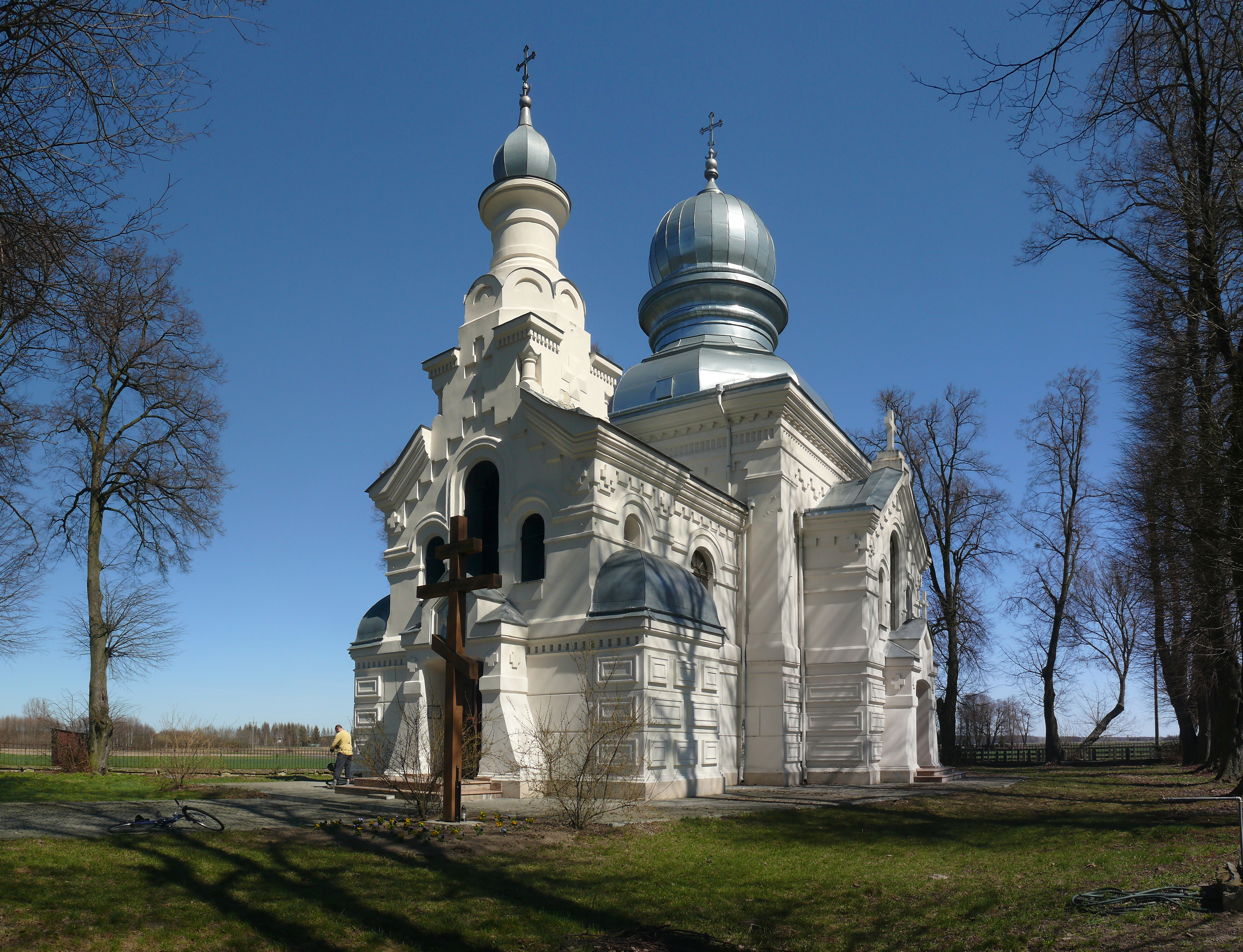
- Church of St. Nicholas
- 51°20′37.3″N 22°57′20.6″E
- Location: Dratów
- Country: Poland
- Denomination: Eastern Orthodoxy
- Churchmanship: Polish Orthodox Church

History
- Status: active Orthodox church
- Dedication: Saint Nicholas
- Dedicated: November 1, 1889

Architecture
- Style: Russian Revival
- Completed: 1889

Specifications
- Materials: brick

Administration
- Diocese: Diocese of Lublin and Chełm

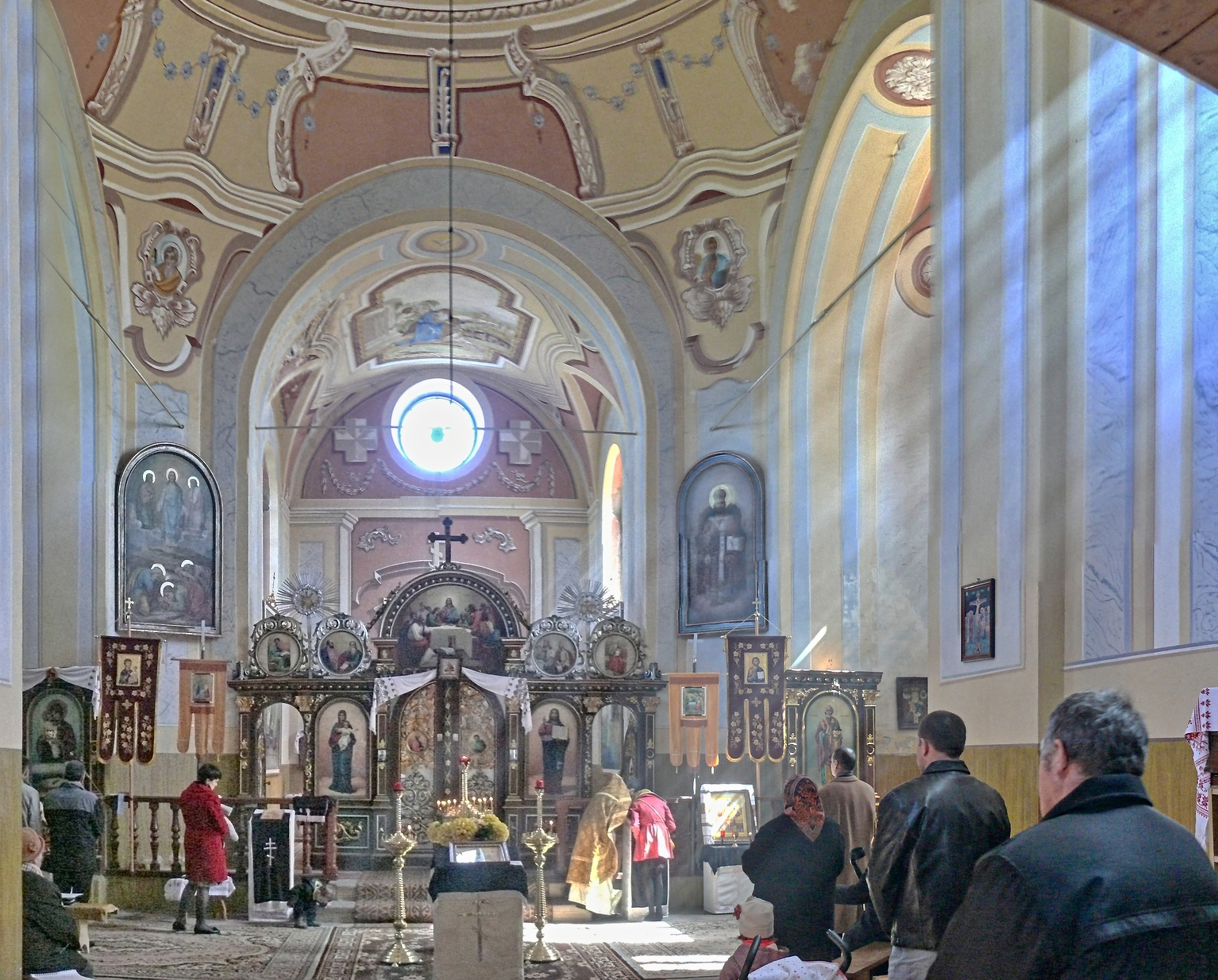
Interior of the church during Mass

The Church of St. Nicholas is an Orthodox parish church in Dratów, belonging to the Lublin Deanery of the Diocese of Lublin and Chełm of the Polish Orthodox Church.

The first church in Dratów was built before 1490 and became the seat of an independent parish in the following century. It was part of the Uniate Eparchy of Chełm–Belz. During its affiliation with the Uniate Church, two new churches were constructed in Dratów – in the 18th century and in 1870 – each time due to the deteriorating condition of the previous building. The church became the property of the Orthodox Church following the Conversion of Chełm Eparchy in 1875.

The present-day church in Dratów was built between 1888 and 1889, based on a design by Viktor Sychegov. It represents the Russian Revival style, which was standard in Russian sacred architecture in the second half of the 19th century. The church remained in operation from its dedication in 1889 until the evacuation of the Orthodox population in 1915. It resumed functioning as a parish seat in 1923, but its activity ceased following the murder of its parson, Father Stefan Malesza, by the Gestapo on 15 August 1942.

In 1947, after the deportation of the Ukrainian Orthodox population, the church was closed. The abandoned building was reopened for liturgical purposes in 1959. It underwent thorough renovations in the 1960s and again between 2007 and 2008.

== History ==
=== Early churches in Dratów ===
The Orthodox parish in Dratów was established in the 16th century, though an Orthodox church already existed there before 1490 as a filial church of the parish in Mogilnica. Following the Union of Brest, the entire Eparchy of Chełm, including the Dratów parish, joined the Uniate Church along with its bishop, Dionysius. The church in Dratów was dedicated to St. Nicholas.

=== Uniate church ===
Inventory and inspection records of the church survive from 1720, 1741, 1774, 1814, 1821, 1836, and 1870. A description from 1741 states that the church was funded by Seweryn Rzewuski and was then dedicated to the Presentation of the Mother of God. The church had three altars, and an iconostasis was noted inside.

An 1836 visitation protocol described the church as being in poor technical condition, requiring roof repairs and damp removal. A decision was made to build a new church, and materials for its construction were gathered from 1844 onward. However, the project was never completed, and the old church remained in use until 1865, when it was deemed too ruined to remain open due to the risk of collapse. The building stood for another two years before being dismantled in 1867, with its materials sold. Three years later, Uniate Bishop Mychajło Kuzemski noted in his visitation records that the newly built church in Dratów had been constructed shortly before his visit. Like its predecessor, this new church was made of wood. In 1875, the Uniate Chełm Eparchy was dissolved, and its parishes, including Dratów, were incorporated into the Russian Orthodox Church.

On 25 April 1886, during Easter celebrations, the church sustained damage in a fire. Two years later, another fire completely destroyed its interior, including icons, the iconostasis, parish registers, and items that had been transferred from the church in Łęczna, which had been destroyed in 1830. Some sources mention only the 1886 fire. For the next three years, the role of the parish church in Dratów was fulfilled by a chapel built in 1886 and, from January 1887, a special room in the local school, which was made available to worshippers only during the winter. The Dratów parish received support from the Brotherhood of the Most Holy Theotokos, affiliated with the Orthodox Basilica of the Birth of the Virgin Mary, to furnish these temporary places of worship.

=== 1889–1915 ===
The brick church in Dratów was built between 1888 and 1889 (or possibly between 1889 and 1890) based on the plans of Viktor Syczugow for the parish of around 1,000 believers. The church was dedicated in 1889 by Bishop Flavian of Lublin. Decorative work inside the church continued until 1891. By 1913, about 1,400 people from Kaniwola, Ludwin, Łęczna, Dratów, and other smaller villages attended the church. Since 1912, the church had been under the care of monks from the St. Onuphrius Monastery in Jabłeczna.

In 1915, due to the ongoing war, the Orthodox population fled eastward to Russia. From 1915 to 1916, the front line passed near Dratów, and the church temporarily served as a field hospital.

=== Interwar period ===
The church remained inactive until 1919 and was not included in a list of churches to be reopened by the Ministry of Religious Affairs and Public Education. However, in 1920, Hieromonk Mitrofan Stelmaszuk from the St. Onuphrius Monastery in Jabłeczna served the church without official permission from local Polish authorities. From 1923, the parish in Dratów legally operated under the Chełm Deanery of the Diocese of Warsaw and Chełm, with the church in Dratów as its only place of worship. In some sources, it is noted that the Dratów church was merely a branch of the parish in Syczyn. The original furnishings of the church were lost during the mass exile and never returned to the building. After 1919, a new iconostasis of unknown origin was installed, though the church bells were never recovered.

The church survived the interwar church re-appropriation efforts and was even renovated in the 1930s. It also suffered no damage during World War II, and the parson, Father Stefan Malesza, managed to carry out another renovation of the church's exterior in 1940. Two years later, on 15 August 1942, Father Malesza and his daughter Olga were executed by the Gestapo for harboring escapees from the forced labor camp in Chełm. This tragic event caused the religious life in the Dratów church to nearly come to a halt, though the church was still attended by priests from nearby parishes. Between 1943 and 1947, the church's iconostasis was destroyed.

The church was closed in 1947, during Operation Vistula. Thanks to the efforts of Father Aleksy Baranow, it was reopened in 1959, and since then, priests from the Transfiguration of the Lord parish in Lublin have overseen its services (the Dratów parish has never had a permanent priest). Services are held every other Sunday. In 1970, a new iconostasis was installed, which came from a church near Przemyśl or Łańcut, though another source suggests it came from Sanok. 15 years later, the frescoes were renovated as part of the final phase of a renovation project that had started in the 1960s.

From 2002 to 2008, another major renovation was carried out, initiated by Archbishop Abel of Lublin and Chełm, with financial support from the Bogdanka Coal Mine. The renovation involved restoring the church's exterior, drying the building's foundations, and reinforcing the ceiling and domes. Since 2009, every August, the church and cemetery host the "Meetings with Orthodoxy" event, which is a cultural and historical gathering.

The Dratów Orthodox-Unite church and its cemetery were entered into the register of monuments on 31 October 1989 under the number A/986/1-3. The cemetery is the final resting place of writer and poet Andrzej Łuczeńczyk, as well as Father Stefan Malesza and his daughter Olga, who were executed by the Nazis.

== Location ==
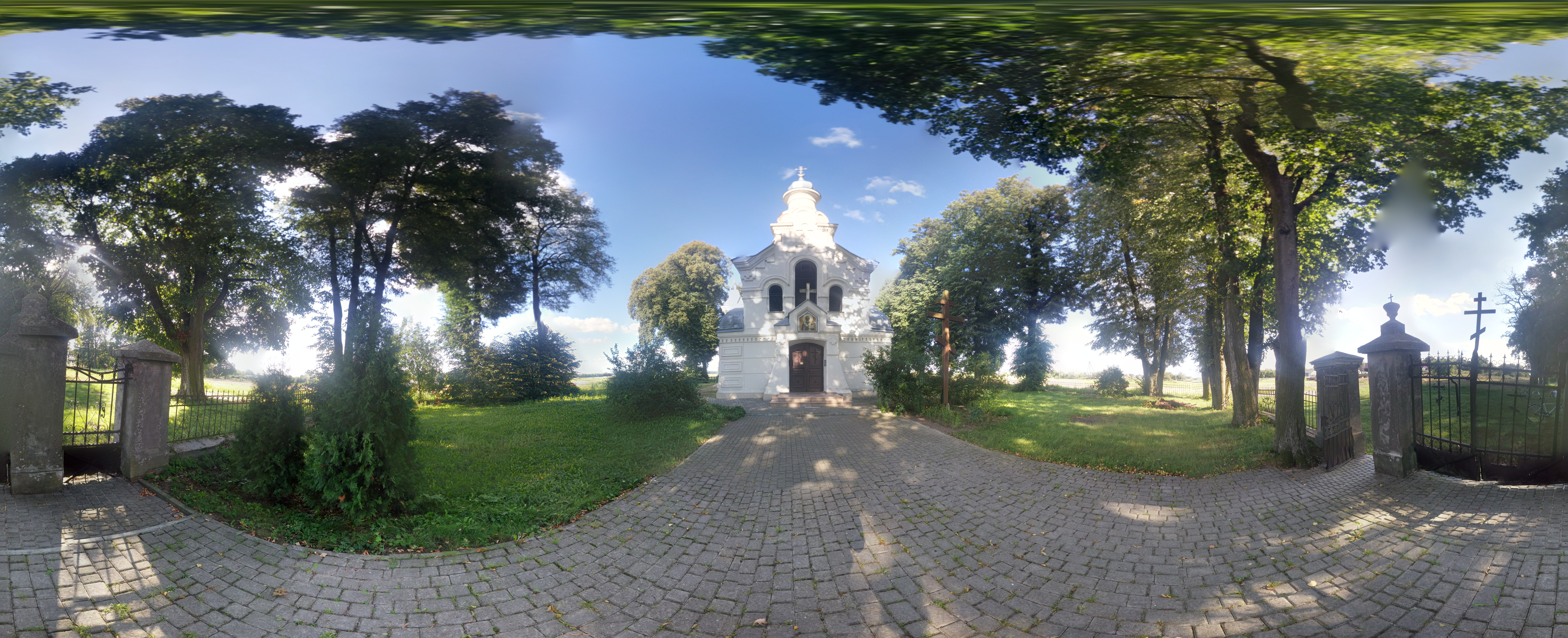
Panorama of the church in Dratów from the entrance side

The church is located on the eastern edge of the village of Dratów, about 200 meters west of where the oldest Orthodox church in the village once stood. Today (in the 21st century), a monument commemorates those killed during a Polish patriotic demonstration in 1918, and an old parsonage building stands nearby. To the east of the church, 200 meters away, is an active parish cemetery, open for both Orthodox and Catholic burials. In the immediate vicinity of the church grounds is a Russian-German military cemetery from World War I. This cemetery contains the graves of soldiers who died in the Dratów area between 7 and 20 August 1915, as well as those who died in the field hospital, which during the war was housed in the Dratów church.

Originally, the church was surrounded by a linden tree grove: 24 trees were planted directly near the church, and another 24 were planted along the access avenue to the church. Due to storms in 2007 and the age of the trees, only a few remain today.

== Architecture ==
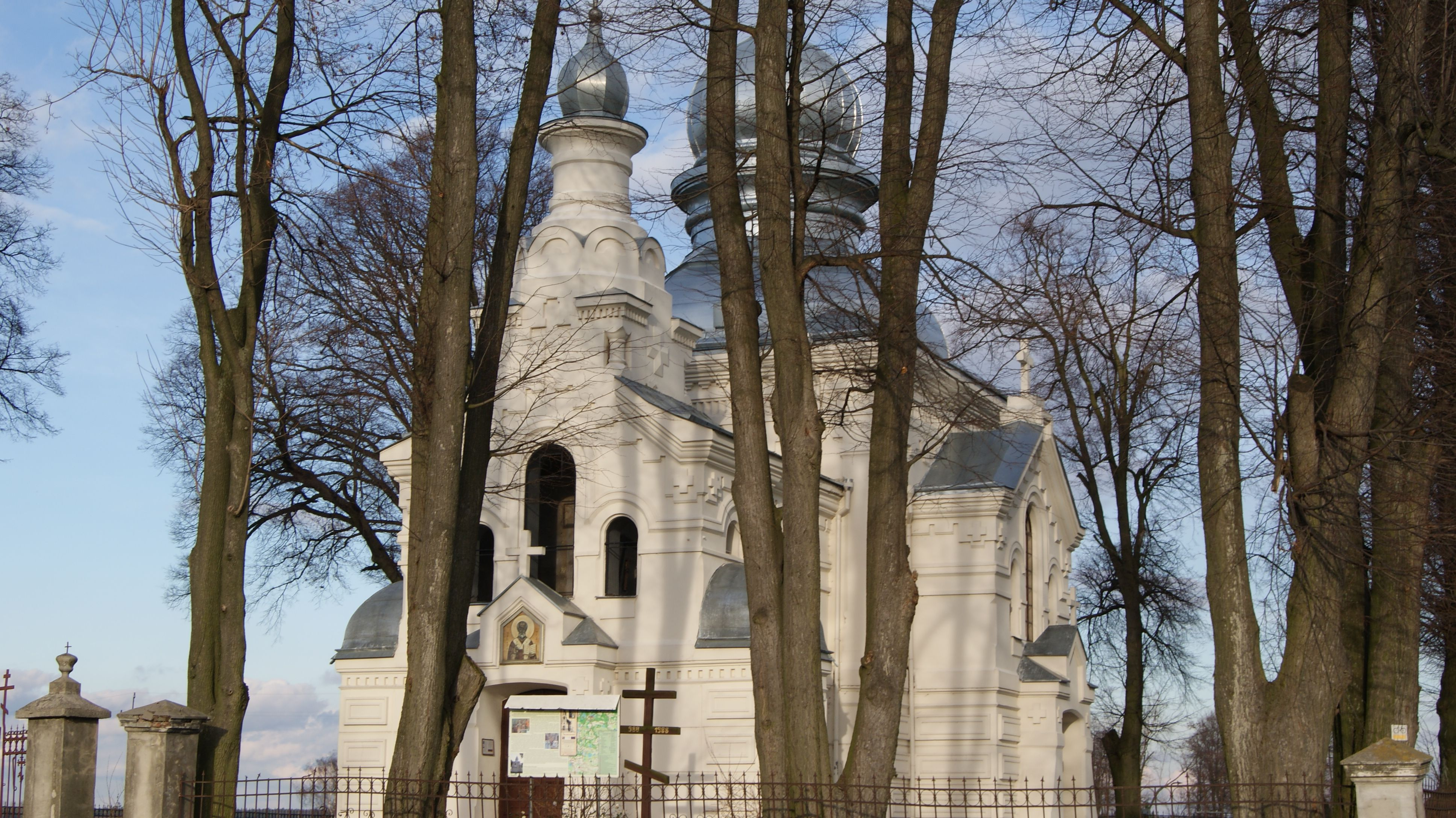
General view of the church

The church represents the Russian Revival style. It is designed to accommodate approximately 700 people during the service. The church is built in the shape of a cross. It is a tripartite structure with a square central nave covered by a four-pitched roof. This roof is crowned by an onion dome on a cylindrical tholobate. The arms of the cross are in the form of rectangular avant-corps. The chancel is also rectangular, with a polygonal apse closing it. The church bell tower is located above the rectangular church porch. It is topped with an onion dome on a tholobate, similar in shape to the dome above the nave. Compared to other churches built in the Chełm Land according to the designs of Viktor Syczugov, the church in Dratów, along with the church in Radcze, stands out for its rich decorative detail on the façade. The building's structure is surrounded by several rows of friezes, and the window frames in the church are double, harmoniously merging into the cornice-like moldings.

All the icons in the church are replicas, as the church has been repeatedly robbed. They were made in Turkowice. The first iconostasis, which is no longer preserved, was created in the Sikorski workshop in St. Petersburg. The iconostasis placed in the church after World War II is a two-tiered one. The lower row contains icons of the Virgin Mary and Christ, while the upper row features the figures of the Evangelists and Saints Peter and Paul, as well as the scene of the Last Supper. Above the royal doors, there is a small icon of the Virgin Mary.

The polychromes were painted in the 20th century by Julian Mizerski and Father Jerzy Ignaciuk. The fresco above the altar area illustrates the parable of the Prodigal Son.
