= Czeberaki =

Czeberaki may refer to the following villages in Poland:

- Czeberaki, Lublin Voivodeship (east Poland)
- Czeberaki, Masovian Voivodeship (east-central Poland)
