= Maria Tarnowska (nurse) =

Polish nurse and social activist

Maria Aniela Tarnowska
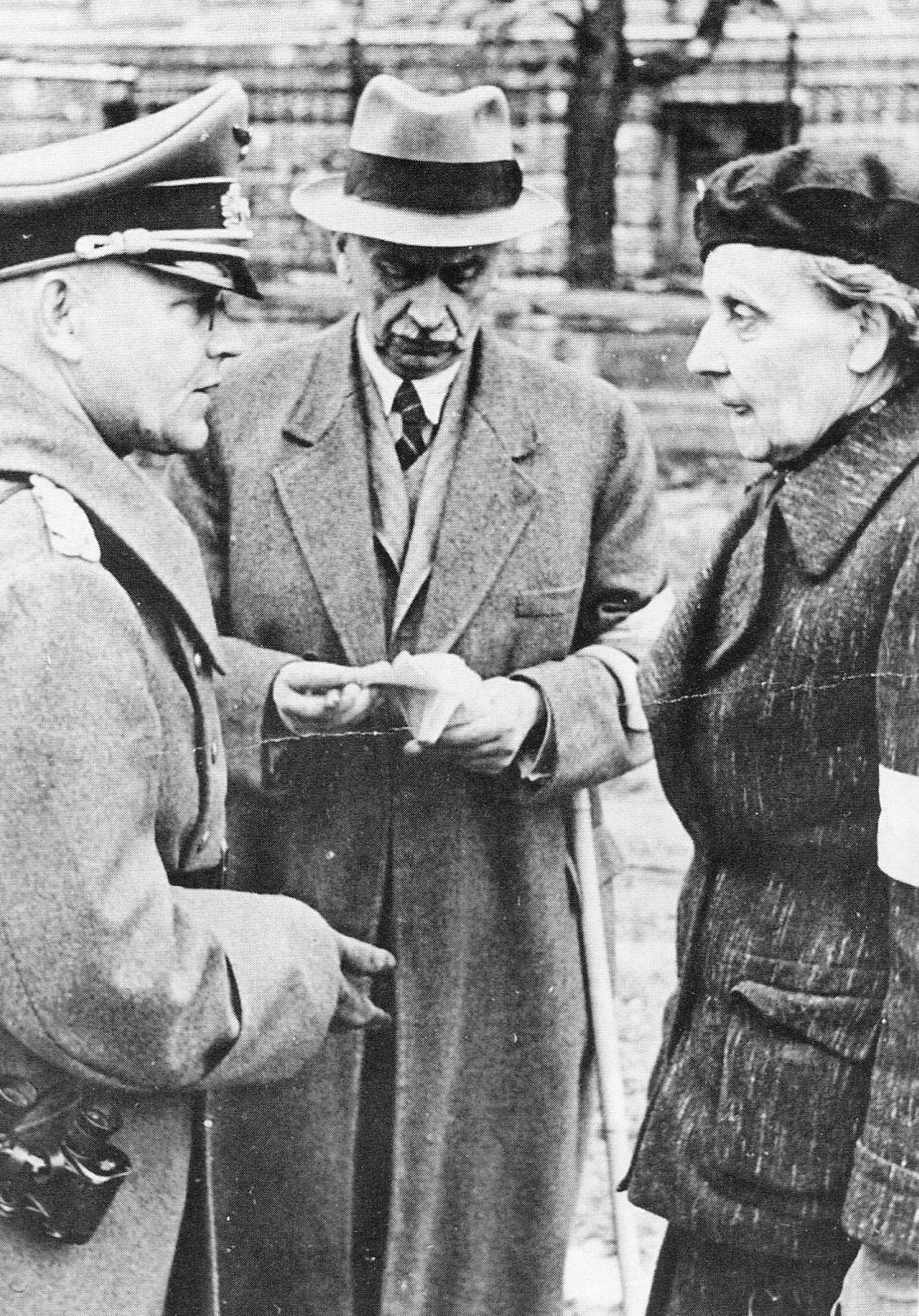
- Warsaw Uprising Capitulation talks with General Rohr

- Coat of arms
- Born: 6 July 1880; Milanów
- Died: 10 July 1965 (aged 85); Warsaw
- Family: Tarnowski née Czetwertyński
- Spouse: Adam Tarnowski
- Father: Włodzimierz Światopełk-Czetwertyński
- Mother: Maria Wanda Uruska

Maria Tarnowska (née Światopełk-Czetwertyńska 6 July 1880 – 10 July 1965) was a Polish nurse and social activist. She was awarded the Florence Nightingale Medal.

== Life ==
Tarnowska was born in Milanów, on the estate of her father Włodzimierz Światopełk-Czetwertyński, a veteran of the January Uprising, her mother, Maria Wanda of the Uruscy counts. She married the diplomat Count Adam Tarnowski.

She was a nurse during the Balkan Wars and on the Austrian-Russian front of World War I. During the Polish-Bolshevik war she was the commandant of the leaders of the Red Cross. In 1923, she was the first Pole to be awarded the Florence Nightingale Medal. After the war, she joined the board of the Polish Red Cross.

In 1942, she was arrested and imprisoned in Pawiak for several months. After her release, she joined the underground, obtained the rank of lieutenant of the Home Army, in September 1944 she was promoted to the rank of major. Due to the high social status and experience, she was delegated to talks with the Germans on the evacuation of the civilian population, which enabled the removal of 20-25 thousand people from Warsaw on September 8–10, 1944, mainly women, children and the elderly. She also participated in capitulation negotiations.

In 1945 she was arrested by the Citizens' Militia on charges of collaborating with the Germans. She was detained in Olkusz, for a month. From 1946 to 1958 she was abroad. She returned to the country and died in Warsaw.

Her book entitled Memoirs was published the National Agency Publishing in 2002.

On July 4, 2016, she was posthumously awarded the Commander's Cross of the Order of Polonia Restituta, for her outstanding merits in defense of the sovereignty and independence of the Polish State.

== Works ==
- Wspomnienia, Warszawa : Krajowa Agencja Wydawnicza, 2002. ISBN 9788388072499, OCLC 1040732374
- Future Will Tell: a memoir. Friesen Press, 2015. ISBN 9781460276259, OCLC 979336954
