= Cichostów-Kolonia =

- Village
- Location within Poland
- Coordinates: 51°40′38″N 22°49′48″E
- Country: Poland
- Voivodeship: Lublin
- County: Parczew
- Gmina: Milanów
- Population: 240

Cichostów-Kolonia [t͡ɕiˈxɔstuf kɔˈlɔɲa] is a village in the administrative district of Gmina Milanów, within Parczew County, Lublin Voivodeship, in eastern Poland. It lies approximately 6 km (4 mi) north-west of Parczew and 51 km (32 mi) north of the regional capital Lublin.
