= Kobusy, Masovian Voivodeship =

Kobusy
- Village
- Location within Poland
- Coordinates: 51°41′46″N 21°40′39″E
- Country: Poland
- Voivodeship: Masovian
- County: Garwolin
- Gmina: Sobolew

Kobusy [kɔˈbusɨ] is a village in the administrative district of Gmina Sobolew, within Garwolin County, Masovian Voivodeship, in east-central Poland.
