= Wiktorzyn, Masovian Voivodeship =

Wiktorzyn
- Settlement
- Location within Poland
- Coordinates: 51°45′06″N 21°38′28″E
- Country: Poland
- Voivodeship: Masovian
- County: Garwolin
- Gmina: Sobolew

Wiktorzyn [vikˈtɔʐɨn] is a settlement in the administrative district of Gmina Sobolew, within Garwolin County, Masovian Voivodeship, in east-central Poland.
