= Łaskarzew Przystanek railway station =

Railway station in Łaskarzew, Poland

Łaskarzew Przystanek

General information
- Location: Łaskarzew, Garwolin, Masovian; Poland
- Coordinates: 51.7849°N 21.6157°E
- System: Rail Station
- Owner: Polskie Koleje Państwowe S.A. (PKP)

Services
Preceding station	Masovian Railways	Following station
Wola Rowska towards Warszawa Zachodnia	R7	Leokadia towards Dęblin
Location

Łaskarzew Przystanek railway station is a railway station at Łaskarzew, Garwolin, Masovian, Poland. It is served by Masovian Railways.
