= Okalew, Lublin Voivodeship =

Okalew
- Village
- Location within Poland
- Coordinates: 51°41′21″N 22°47′54″E
- Country: Poland
- Voivodeship: Lublin
- County: Parczew
- Gmina: Milanów

Okalew [ɔˈkalɛf] is a village in the administrative district of Gmina Milanów, within Parczew County, Lublin Voivodeship, in eastern Poland.
