= Ostrożeń Pierwszy =

- Village
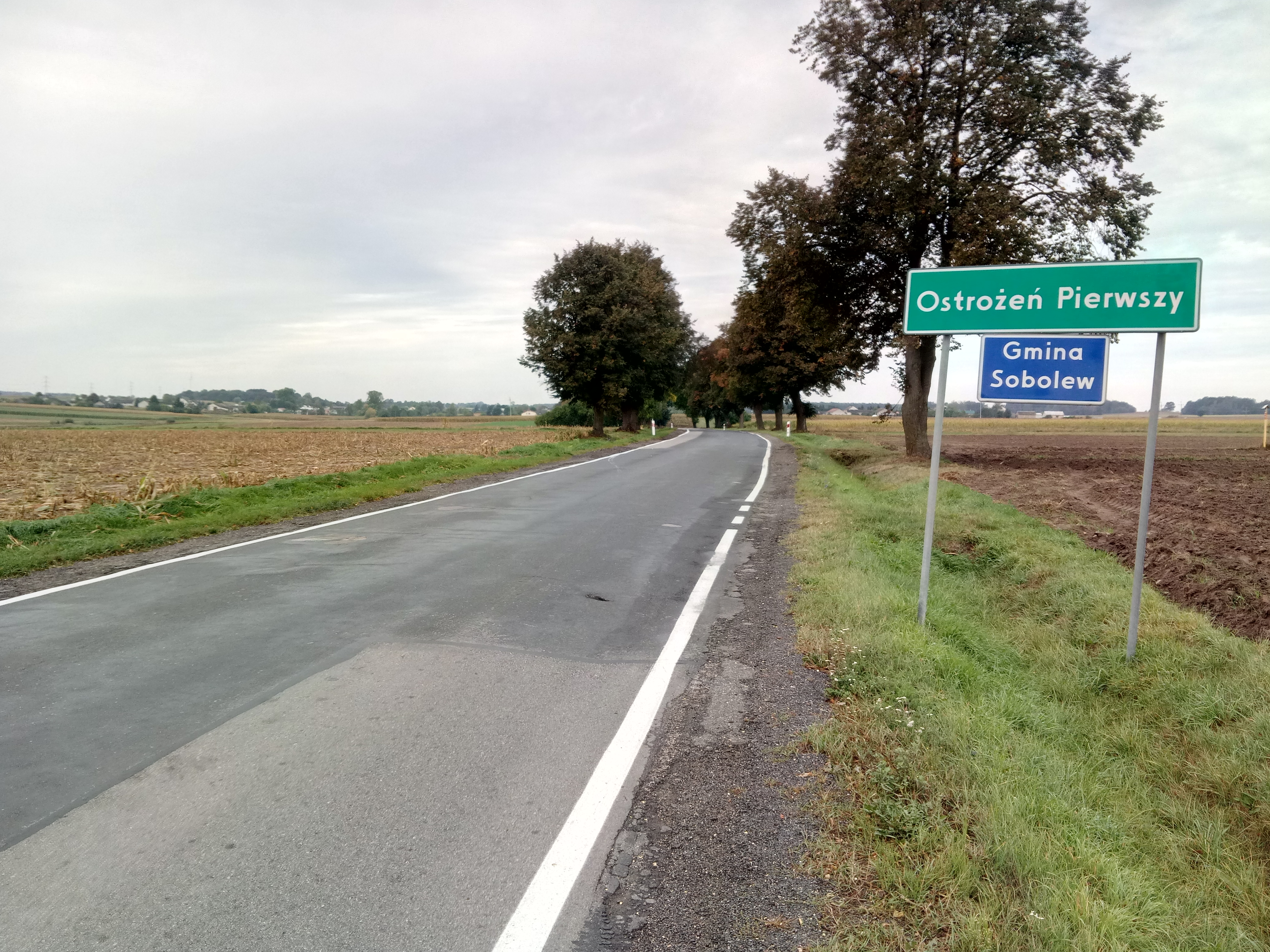

- Location within Poland
- Coordinates: 51°47′23″N 21°45′04″E
- Country: Poland
- Voivodeship: Masovian
- County: Garwolin
- Gmina: Sobolew

Ostrożeń Pierwszy [ɔsˈtrɔʐɛɲ ˈpjɛrfʂɨ] is a village in the administrative district of Gmina Sobolew, within Garwolin County, Masovian Voivodeship, in east-central Poland.
