= Battles of Parczew, Jabłoń and Milanów =

1939 battles of the Soviet invasion of Poland

- Part of the Soviet Invasion of Poland in the European theatre of World War II
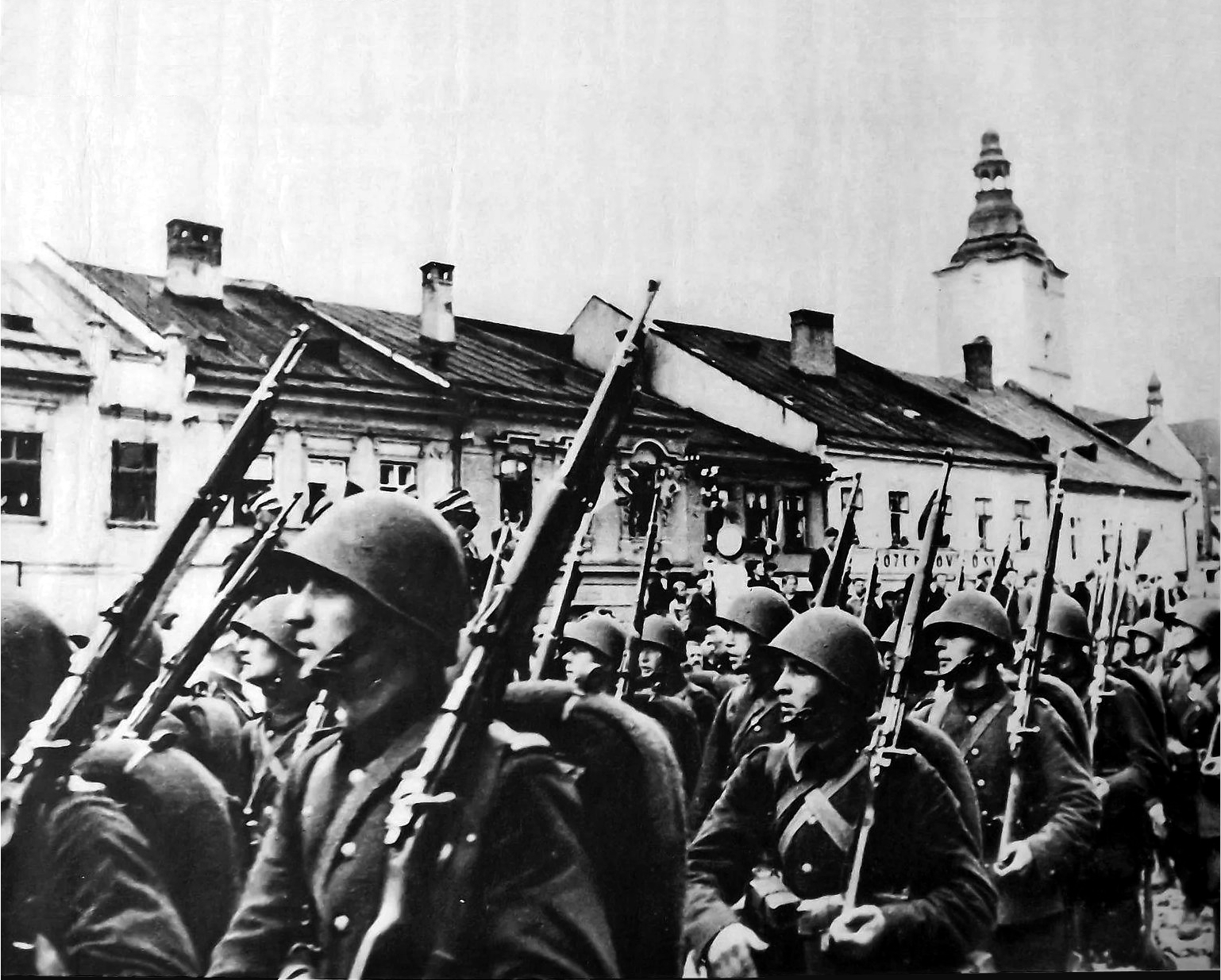
- Polish infantry marching 1939
Date	September 29–30, 1939
Location	region of Parczew, Jabłoń and Milanów, Lublin Voivodeship, Poland
Result	Polish victory

Belligerents
Soviet Union	Poland

Commanders and leaders
Unknown	(Second Polish Republic) Franciszek Kleeberg

Strength
143rd Rifle Division	Independent Operational Group Polesie

Casualties and losses
170 dead, 300 wounded, 100 POWs	20 dead

The Battles of Parczew, Jabłoń and Milanów (Note: Those engagement are rarely referred to as individual battles in Polish historiography, and are usually described as part of one series of engagements. Komorowski for example refers to them as "fights near Jabłoń and Milanów". The Milanów engagement is called a battle by Szawlowski.) constituted one of the major battles between the Polish Army and the Red Army during the Soviet invasion of Poland. They took place on September 29–30 of 1939 at the beginning of the Second World War. They resulted in a Polish victory, as the Polish units successfully broke through the Soviet forces near the town of Parczew and progressed towards the Świętokrzyskie Mountains.

== Background ==
Germany invaded Poland on 1 September 1939, marking the beginning of World War II. On 17 September 1939 the Soviet Union, then an ally of Germany, invaded Poland from the east. They encountered only limited resistance, as the majority of Polish forces were thinly stretched against the German invaders. Despite the increasingly difficult situation, some Polish units continued to struggle against the advancing enemies; one of the units resisting the Soviets was the Independent Operational Group Polesie under General Franciszek Kleeberg.

== Battles ==
The Polesie Group, about 18,000 strong, was followed by the Soviets, which planned to neutralize it before securing the Polesie region.

The group encountered the Soviets on September 28 near the village of Jabłoń, while advancing south towards Parczew. A number of smaller engagements took place over the next two days. The Soviet advance was interrupted by a successful Polish defense, and eventually a Polish counterattack pushed the Soviets back. As the Polish units advanced towards Milanów, they defeated another Soviet attack, inflicting significant casualties on the enemy and taking a number of prisoners.

== Aftermath ==
Soviets took over 100 casualties near Milanów. Their casualties at Jabłoń were few dozen, with a tank captured and another few dozen POWs switching sides to join the Polish army.

A couple of days later, Soviet troops defeated the Poles at Wytyczno; This was all the end of the campaign, after the German troops took part in the last major battle of the Polish campaign.

== See also ==
- List of World War II military equipment of Poland
- List of Soviet Union military equipment of World War II
