= Godzisz, Garwolin County =

Godzisz
- Village
- Location within Poland
- Coordinates: 51°42′17″N 21°39′33″E
- Country: Poland
- Voivodeship: Masovian
- County: Garwolin
- Gmina: Sobolew

Godzisz [ˈɡɔd͡ʑiʂ] is a village in the administrative district of Gmina Sobolew, within Garwolin County, Masovian Voivodeship, in east-central Poland.
