= Nowa Krępa, Garwolin County =

Nowa Krępa
- Village
- Location within Poland
- Coordinates: 51°43′44″N 21°36′45″E
- Country: Poland
- Voivodeship: Masovian
- County: Garwolin
- Gmina: Sobolew

Nowa Krępa [ˈnɔva ˈkrɛmpa] is a village in the administrative district of Gmina Sobolew, within Garwolin County, Masovian Voivodeship, in east-central Poland.
