= Chotynia-Kolonia =

- Village
- Location within Poland
- Coordinates: 51°46′54″N 21°40′21″E
- Country: Poland
- Voivodeship: Masovian
- County: Garwolin
- Gmina: Sobolew

Chotynia-Kolonia [xɔˈtɨɲa kɔˈlɔɲa] is a village in the administrative district of Gmina Sobolew, within Garwolin County, Masovian Voivodeship, in east-central Poland.
