= Karolinów, Garwolin County =

Karolinów
- Settlement
- Location within Poland
- Coordinates: 51°47′55″N 21°43′12″E
- Country: Poland
- Voivodeship: Masovian
- County: Garwolin
- Gmina: Sobolew

Karolinów [karɔˈlinuf] is a settlement in the administrative district of Gmina Sobolew, within Garwolin County, Masovian Voivodeship, in east-central Poland.
