= Chotynia =

- Village
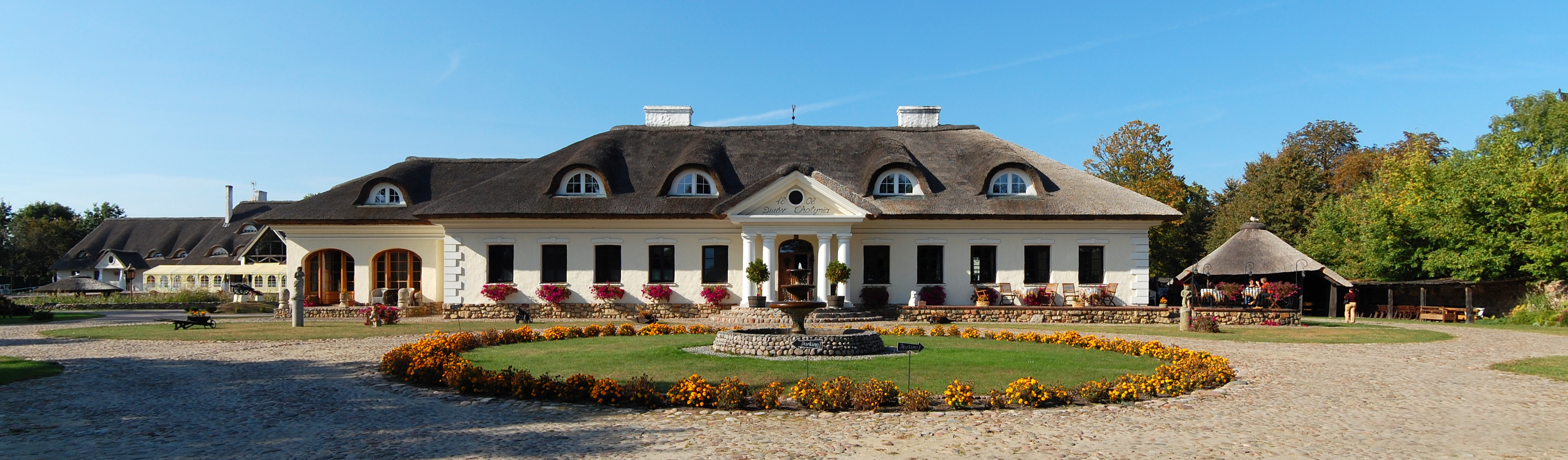
- Chotynia manor house

- Location within Poland
- Coordinates: 51°48′N 21°43′E
- Country: Poland
- Voivodeship: Masovian
- County: Garwolin
- Gmina: Sobolew
- Population: 490

Chotynia [xɔˈtɨɲa] is a village that is located in the administrative district of Gmina Sobolew, within Garwolin County, Masovian Voivodeship, in east-central Poland.
