= Chrusty, Masovian Voivodeship =

Chrusty
- Settlement
- Location within Poland
- Coordinates: 51°43′52″N 21°38′49″E
- Country: Poland
- Voivodeship: Masovian
- County: Garwolin
- Gmina: Sobolew

Chrusty [ˈxrustɨ] is a settlement in the administrative district of Gmina Sobolew, within Garwolin County, Masovian Voivodeship, in east-central Poland.
