= Michałki, Masovian Voivodeship =

Michałki
- Village
- Location within Poland
- Coordinates: 51°45′34″N 21°45′31″E
- Country: Poland
- Voivodeship: Masovian
- County: Garwolin
- Gmina: Sobolew

Michałki (Polish pronunciation: [miˈxawkʲi]) is a village in the administrative district of Gmina Sobolew, within Garwolin County, Masovian Voivodeship, in east-central Poland.
