= Kopina, Parczew County =

Kopina
- Village
- Location within Poland
- Coordinates: 51°43′32″N 22°50′30″E
- Country: Poland
- Voivodeship: Lublin
- County: Parczew
- Gmina: Milanów

Kopina [kɔˈpina] is a village in the administrative district of Gmina Milanów, within Parczew County, Lublin Voivodeship, in eastern Poland.
