= Dratów =

- Village
- Location within Poland
- Coordinates: 51°21′N 22°57′E
- Country: Poland
- Voivodeship: Lublin
- County: Łęczna
- Gmina: Ludwin

Dratów [ˈdratuf] is a village in the administrative district of Gmina Ludwin, within Łęczna County, Lublin Voivodeship, in eastern Poland.

There is an Orthodox Church of St. Nicholas in the village, built between 1888 and 1889, based on a design by Viktor Sychegov. It represents the Russian Revival style, which was standard in Russian sacred architecture in the second half of the 19th century. The church remained in operation from its dedication in 1889 until the evacuation of the Orthodox population in 1915. It resumed functioning as a parish seat in 1923, but its activity ceased following the murder of its parson, Father Stefan Malesza, by the Gestapo on 15 August 1942. In 1947, after the deportation of the Ukrainian Orthodox population, the church was closed. The abandoned building was reopened for liturgical purposes in 1959. It underwent thorough renovations in the 1960s and again between 2007 and 2008.
