= Kownacica =

- Village
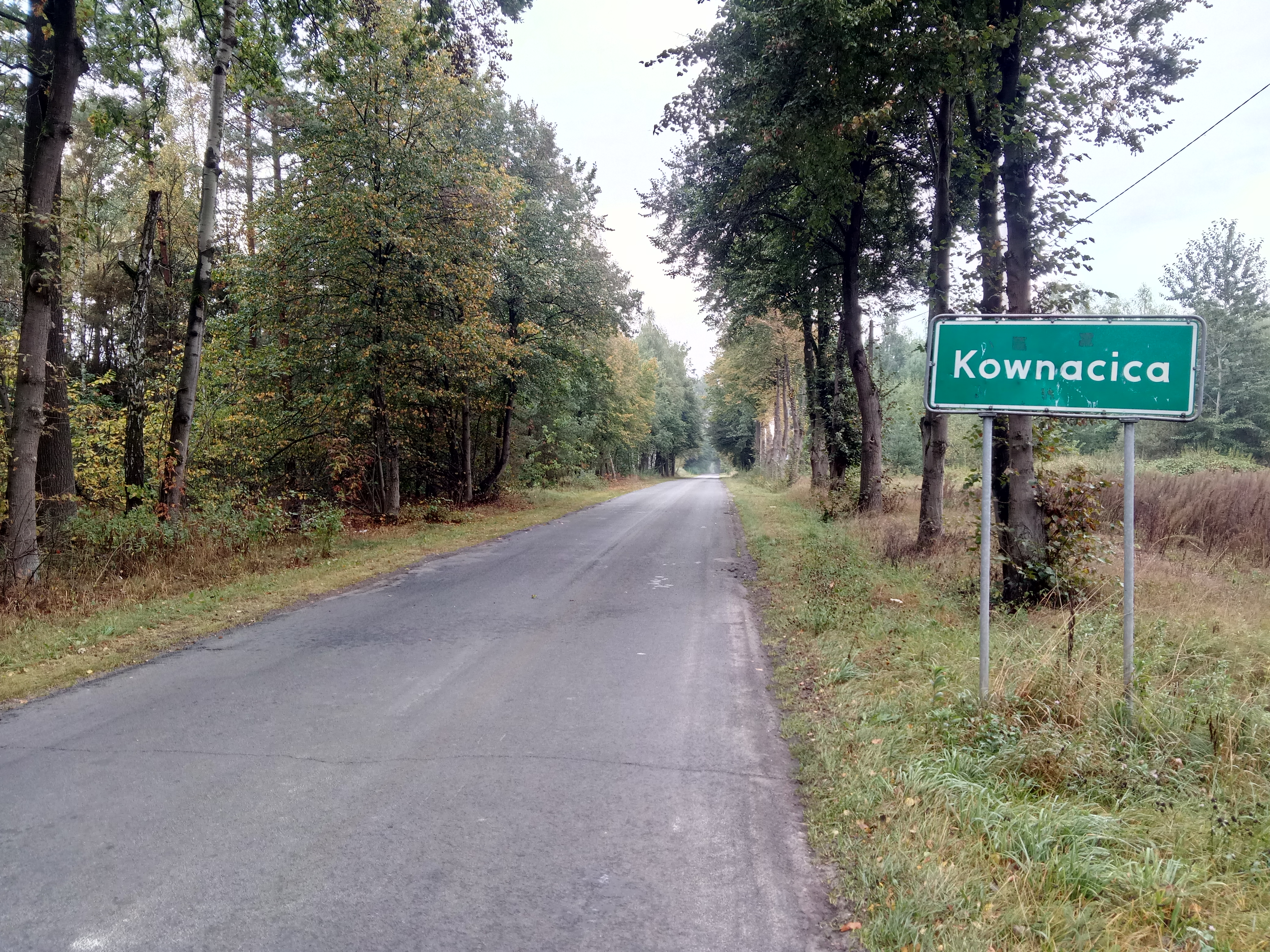

- Location within Poland
- Coordinates: 51°46′N 21°42′E
- Country: Poland
- Voivodeship: Masovian
- County: Garwolin
- Gmina: Sobolew
- Time zone: UTC+1 (CET)
  - Summer (DST): UTC+2 (CEST)

Kownacica [kɔvnaˈt͡ɕit͡sa] is a village in the administrative district of Gmina Sobolew, within Garwolin County, Masovian Voivodeship, in east-central Poland.

Five Polish citizens were murdered by Nazi Germany in the village during World War II.
