= Mazurki, Masovian Voivodeship =

Mazurki
- Settlement
- Location within Poland
- Coordinates: 51°47′34″N 21°43′22″E
- Country: Poland
- Voivodeship: Masovian
- County: Garwolin
- Gmina: Sobolew

Mazurki [maˈzurki] is a settlement in the administrative district of Gmina Sobolew, within Garwolin County, Masovian Voivodeship, in east-central Poland.
