= Trzcianka, Gmina Sobolew =

Trzcianka
- Village
- Location within Poland
- Coordinates: 51°45′34″N 21°45′32″E
- Country: Poland
- Voivodeship: Masovian
- County: Garwolin
- Gmina: Sobolew

Trzcianka [ˈtʂt͡ɕaŋka] is a village in the administrative district of Gmina Sobolew, within Garwolin County, Masovian Voivodeship, in east-central Poland.
