= Rudno, Parczew County =

Rudno
- Village
- Location within Poland
- Coordinates: 51°45′15″N 22°57′0″E
- Country: Poland
- Voivodeship: Lublin
- County: Parczew
- Gmina: Milanów

Rudno [ˈrudnɔ] is a village in the administrative district of Gmina Milanów, within Parczew County, Lublin Voivodeship, in eastern Poland.
