= Rudzieniec =

- Village
- Location within Poland
- Coordinates: 51°44′N 22°58′E
- Country: Poland
- Voivodeship: Lublin
- County: Parczew
- Gmina: Milanów

Rudzieniec [ruˈd͡ʑɛɲɛt͡s] is a village in the administrative district of Gmina Milanów, within Parczew County, Lublin Voivodeship, in eastern Poland.

== Notable people ==
- Tomasz Zaliwski (1929–2006), film, radio, and theatre actor
