= Anielów, Masovian Voivodeship =

Village in Masovian Voivodeship, Poland

Anielów
- Village
- Location within Poland
- Coordinates: 51°46′34″N 21°46′32″E
- Country: Poland
- Voivodeship: Masovian
- County: Garwolin
- Gmina: Sobolew

Anielów [aˈɲɛluf] is a village in the administrative district of Gmina Sobolew, within Garwolin County, Masovian Voivodeship, in east-central Poland.
