= Uśniak =

- Settlement
- Location within Poland
- Coordinates: 51°53′11″N 21°26′03″E
- Country: Poland
- Voivodeship: Masovian
- County: Garwolin
- Gmina: Sobolew

Uśniak [ˈuɕɲak] is a settlement in the administrative district of Gmina Sobolew, within Garwolin County, Masovian Voivodeship, in east-central Poland.
