= Nowiny Sobolewskie =

- Settlement
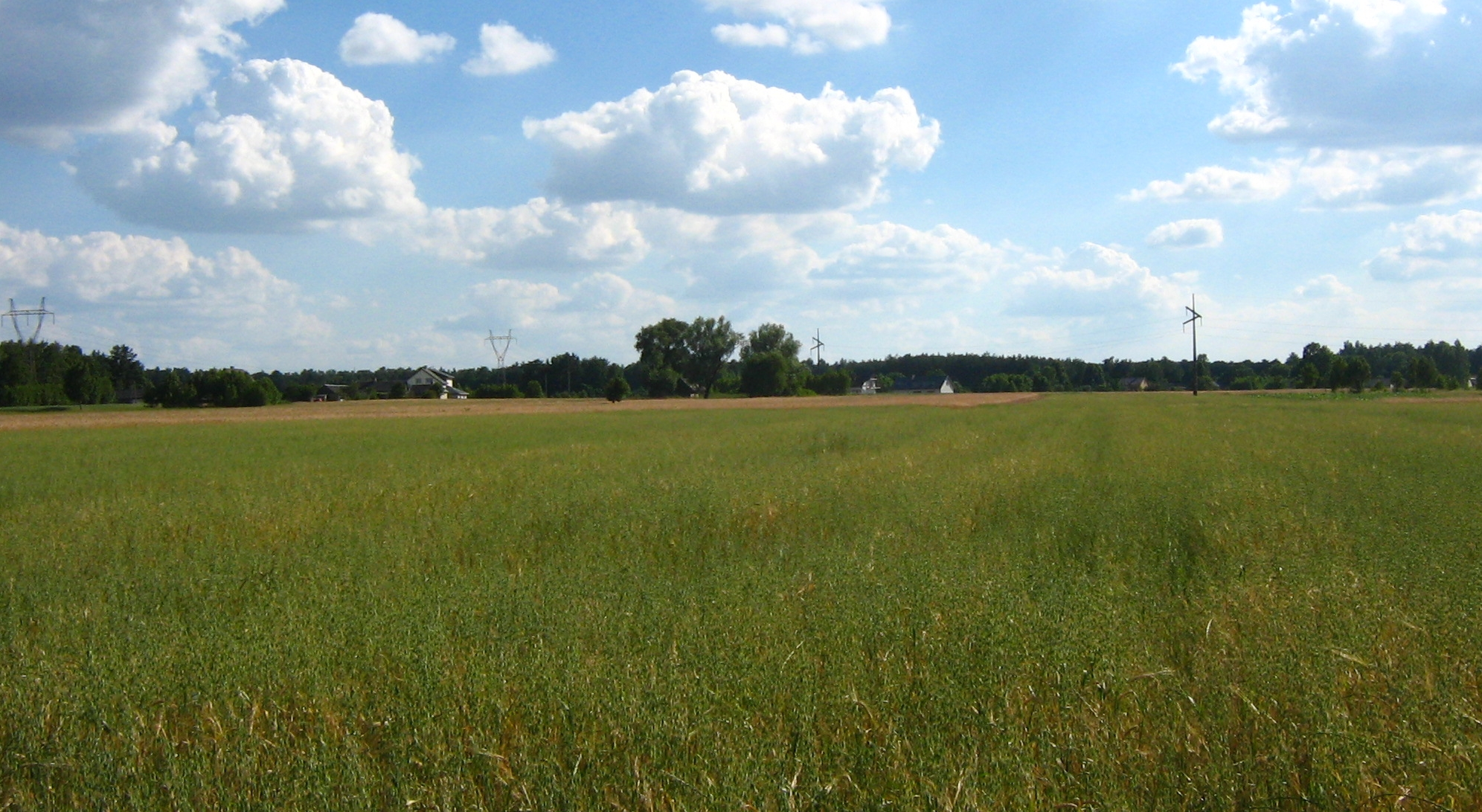
- Fields in Nowiny Sobolewskie

- Location within Poland
- Coordinates: 51°45′27″N 21°21′41″E
- Country: Poland
- Voivodeship: Masovian
- County: Garwolin
- Gmina: Sobolew

Nowiny Sobolewskie [nɔˈvinɨ sɔbɔˈlɛfskʲɛ] is a settlement in the administrative district of Gmina Sobolew, within Garwolin County, Masovian Voivodeship, in east-central Poland.
