= Zieleniec, Lublin Voivodeship =

Zieleniec
- Village
- Location within Poland
- Coordinates: 51°43′59″N 22°53′15″E
- Country: Poland
- Voivodeship: Lublin
- County: Parczew
- Gmina: Milanów

Zieleniec [ʑɛˈlɛɲɛt͡s] is a village in the administrative district of Gmina Milanów, within Parczew County, Lublin Voivodeship, in eastern Poland.
