= Ostrożeń Drugi =

- Village
- Location within Poland
- Coordinates: 51°47′4″N 21°44′41″E
- Country: Poland
- Voivodeship: Masovian
- County: Garwolin
- Gmina: Sobolew

Ostrożeń Drugi [ɔsˈtrɔʐɛɲ ˈdruɡi] is a village in the administrative district of Gmina Sobolew, within Garwolin County, Masovian Voivodeship, in east-central Poland.
