= Tomasz Zaliwski =

Polish film, theatre, and radio actor

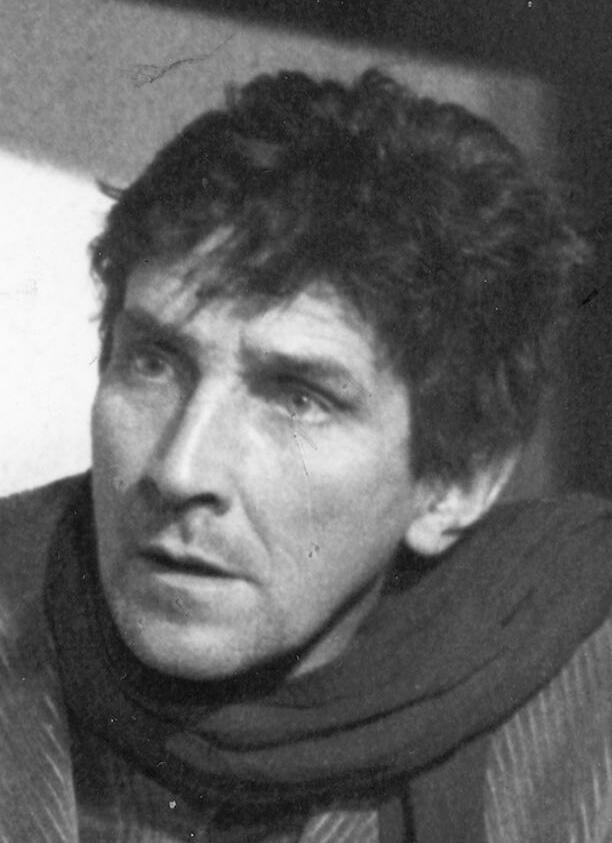
Image of Kwiatkowska Tomasz

Tomasz Zbigniew Zaliwski (15 December 1929, Rudzieniec, Poland – 13 July 2006, Warsaw) was a film, theatre, and radio actor.

== Biography ==
He interrupted his studies at the Adam Mickiewicz University in Poznań (mathematical faculty) to move on to study acting at The Aleksander Zelwerowicz National Academy of Dramatic Art in Warsaw and graduated in 1955. His theatre debut was in 1956. His entire professional life (until his retirement in 1996) was associated with the Warsaw Theatre of the People (since 1975, Teatr Nowy). He has also dubbed.

Zaliwski earned a laureate acting in the category of radio dramas from the Polish Radio Theatre for his role in the Dwa Teatry in Sopot in 2001.

He was married to the actress Teresa Lipowska. Zaliwski died in 2006, and was consequently buried in Warsaw at the cemetery in Pyry.

== Filmography ==
- Katastrofa w Gibraltarze (1984)
