= Kaleń Pierwszy =

- Village
- Location within Poland
- Coordinates: 51°43′N 21°42′E
- Country: Poland
- Voivodeship: Masovian
- County: Garwolin
- Gmina: Sobolew

Kaleń Pierwszy [ˈkalɛɲ ˈpjɛrfʂɨ] is a village in the administrative district of Gmina Sobolew, within Garwolin County, Masovian Voivodeship, in east-central Poland.
