= Kaleń Drugi =

- Village
- Location within Poland
- Coordinates: 51°42′56″N 21°42′46″E
- Country: Poland
- Voivodeship: Masovian
- County: Garwolin
- Gmina: Sobolew

Kaleń Drugi [ˈkalɛɲ ˈdruɡi] is a village in the administrative district of Gmina Sobolew, within Garwolin County, Masovian Voivodeship, in east-central Poland.
