= Radcze =

- Village
- Location within Poland
- Coordinates: 51°46′N 22°59′E
- Country: Poland
- Voivodeship: Lublin
- County: Parczew
- Gmina: Milanów
- Time zone: UTC+1 (CET)
  - Summer (DST): UTC+2 (CEST)

Radcze [ˈratt͡ʂɛ] is a village in the administrative district of Gmina Milanów, within Parczew County, Lublin Voivodeship, in eastern Poland.

According to the 2021 census, there are 430 residents of Radcze.

== History ==
Four Polish citizens were murdered by Nazi Germany in the village during World War II.
