= Czeberaki, Lublin Voivodeship =

Czeberaki
- Village
- Location within Poland
- Coordinates: 51°41′28″N 22°57′19″E
- Country: Poland
- Voivodeship: Lublin
- County: Parczew
- Gmina: Milanów

Czeberaki [t͡ʂɛbɛˈraki] is a village in the administrative district of Gmina Milanów, within Parczew County, Lublin Voivodeship, in eastern Poland.
