= Leokadia, Masovian Voivodeship =

Leokadia
- Village
- Location within Poland
- Coordinates: 51°47′N 21°38′E
- Country: Poland
- Voivodeship: Masovian
- County: Garwolin
- Gmina: Łaskarzew

Leokadia [lɛɔˈkadja] is a village in the administrative district of Gmina Łaskarzew, within Garwolin County, Masovian Voivodeship, in east-central Poland.
