= Grabniak, Garwolin County =

Grabniak
- Village
- Location within Poland
- Coordinates: 51°42′48″N 21°41′49″E
- Country: Poland
- Voivodeship: Masovian
- County: Garwolin
- Gmina: Sobolew

Grabniak [ˈɡrabɲak] is a village in the administrative district of Gmina Sobolew, within Garwolin County, Masovian Voivodeship, in east-central Poland.
