= Milanów, Garwolin County =

Milanów
- Settlement
- Location within Poland
- Coordinates: 51°44′26″N 21°41′28″E
- Country: Poland
- Voivodeship: Masovian
- County: Garwolin
- Gmina: Sobolew

Milanów [miˈlanuf] is a settlement in the administrative district of Gmina Sobolew, within Garwolin County, Masovian Voivodeship, in east-central Poland.
