= Poręby, Garwolin County =

Poręby
- Settlement
- Location within Poland
- Coordinates: 51°45′24″N 21°41′46″E
- Country: Poland
- Voivodeship: Masovian
- County: Garwolin
- Gmina: Sobolew

Poręby [pɔˈrɛmbɨ] is a settlement in the administrative district of Gmina Sobolew, within Garwolin County, Masovian Voivodeship, in east-central Poland.
