= Gmina Milanów =

Gmina Milanów Milanów Commune
- Gmina
- Coat of arms

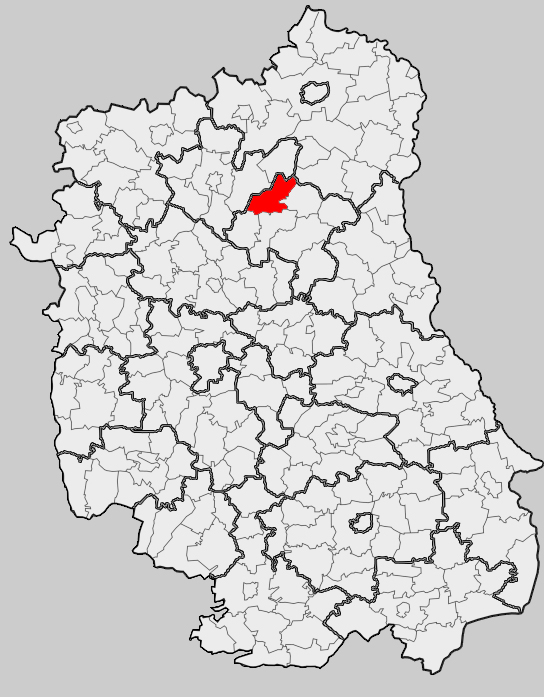
- Location within the county and voivodeship
- Coordinates (Milanów): 51°42′11″N 22°52′38″E
- Country: Poland
- Voivodeship: Lublin
- County: Parczew
- Seat: Milanów

Area
  - Total: 116.64 km^{2} (45.03 sq mi)

Population (2014)
  - Total: 4,016
  - Density: 34.43/km^{2} (89.18/sq mi)
- Website: http://www.milanow.iap.pl/

Gmina Milanów is a rural gmina (administrative district) in Parczew County, Lublin Voivodeship, in eastern Poland. Its seat is the village of Milanów, which lies approximately 8 kilometres (5 mi) north of Parczew and 55 km (34 mi) north-east of the regional capital Lublin.

The gmina covers an area of 116.64 square kilometres (45.0 sq mi), and as of 2006 its total population is 4,174 (4,016 in 2014).

== Neighbouring gminas ==
Gmina Milanów is bordered by the gminas of Jabłoń, Komarówka Podlaska, Parczew, Siemień, Wisznice and Wohyń.

== Villages ==
The gmina contains the following villages having the status of sołectwo: Cichostów, Czeberaki, Kopina, Kostry, Milanów, Okalew, Radcze, Rudno (solectwos: Rudno I, Rudno II and Rudno III), Rudzieniec and Zieleniec.
