= Sobolew, Masovian Voivodeship =

Sobolew
- Village
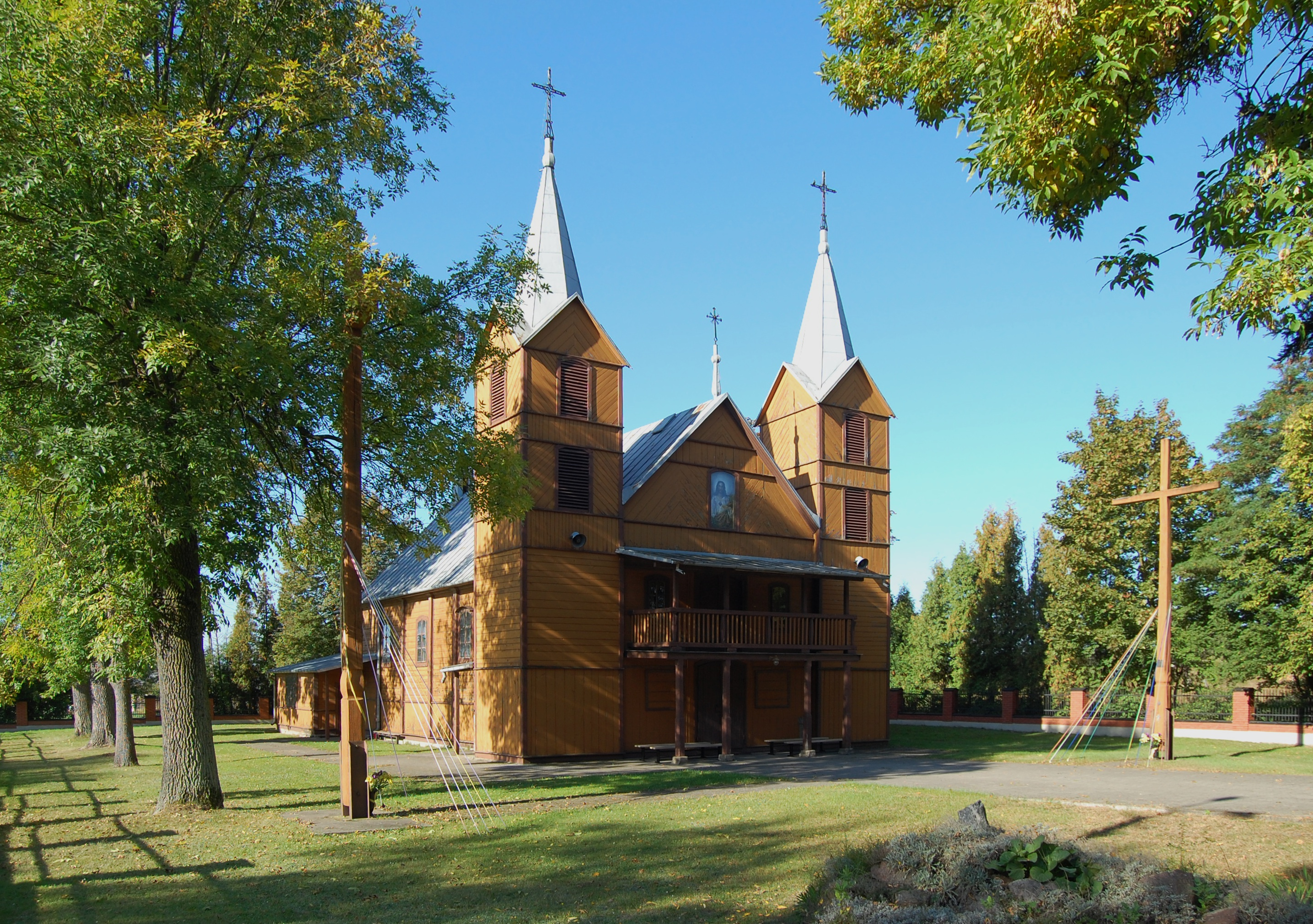
- Church of Saints Peter and Paul

- Location within Poland
- Coordinates: 51°44′23″N 21°40′7″E
- Country: Poland
- Voivodeship: Masovian
- County: Garwolin
- Gmina: Sobolew

Population
  - Total: 2,200

Sobolew [sɔˈbɔlɛf] is a village in Garwolin County, Masovian Voivodeship, in east-central Poland. It is the seat of the gmina (administrative district) called Gmina Sobolew.

== Transport ==
Sobolew lies along vovoideship road 807.

Sobolew has a station on the Warsaw-Lublin railway line.
