= Gmina Sobolew =

Gmina Sobolew Sobolew Commune
- Gmina
- Flag Coat of arms
- Interactive map of Gmina Sobolew
- Coordinates (Sobolew): 51°44′23″N 21°40′7″E
- Country: Poland
- Voivodeship: Masovian
- County: Garwolin
- Seat: Sobolew

Area
  - Total: 94.83 km^{2} (36.61 sq mi)

Population (2006)
  - Total: 8,312
  - Density: 87.65/km^{2} (227.0/sq mi)
- Website: http://www.sobolew.pl/

Gmina Sobolew is a rural gmina (administrative district) in Garwolin County, Masovian Voivodeship, in east-central Poland. Its seat is the village of Sobolew, which lies approximately 18 kilometres (11 mi) east of Garwolin and 71 km (44 mi) south-east of Warsaw.

The gmina covers an area of 94.83 square kilometres (36.6 sq mi), and as of 2006 its total population was 8,312.

== Villages ==
Gmina Sobolew contains the villages and settlements of:

- Anielów
- Chotynia, Chotynia-Kolonia
- Chrusty
- Drobina
- Emerytka, Godzisz
- Gończyce, Grabniak
- Kaleń Drugi, Kaleń Pierwszy
- Karolinów
- Kobusy
- Kownacica
- Leonorów
- Mazurki
- Michałki
- Milanów
- Nowa Krępa
- Nowiny Sobolewskie
- Ostrożeń Drugi
- Ostrożeń Pierwszy
- Poręby
- Przyłęk
- Sobolew
- Sokół
- Teofilów
- Trzcianka
- Uśniak
- Walerków
- Wiktorzyn
- Zaprzytnica

== Neighbouring gminas ==
Gmina Sobolew is bordered by the gminas of Górzno, Łaskarzew, Maciejowice, Trojanów and Żelechów.
