= Milanów, Lublin Voivodeship =

Milanów
- Village
- Location within Poland
- Coordinates: 51°42′11″N 22°52′38″E
- Country: Poland
- Voivodeship: Lublin
- County: Parczew
- Gmina: Milanów
- Population: 1,105

Milanów [miˈlanuf] is a village in Parczew County, Lublin Voivodeship, in eastern Poland. It is the seat of the gmina (administrative district) called Gmina Milanów.
