= Brudno =

Brudno may refer to:

- Brudno, Poland, a village in Lublin Voivodeship, Poland
- Alexander L'vovich Brudno (Russian: Александр Львович Брудно; 1918–2009), Russian computer scientist
- Edward A. Brudno (1940–1973), American Air Force captain
- Ezra Brudno (1877–1954), American author
