= Siedliki =

- Village
- Location within Poland
- Coordinates: 51°37′N 22°56′E
- Country: Poland
- Voivodeship: Lublin
- County: Parczew
- Gmina: Parczew

Siedliki [ɕɛdˈliki] is a village in the administrative district of Gmina Parczew, within Parczew County, Lublin Voivodeship, in eastern Poland. It lies approximately 5 kilometres (3 mi) east of Parczew and 49 km (30 mi) north-east of the regional capital Lublin.
