= Church of Saints Cosmas and Damian, Kolechowice =

Orthodox church in Kolechowice, Poland

Church of Saints Cosmas and Damian
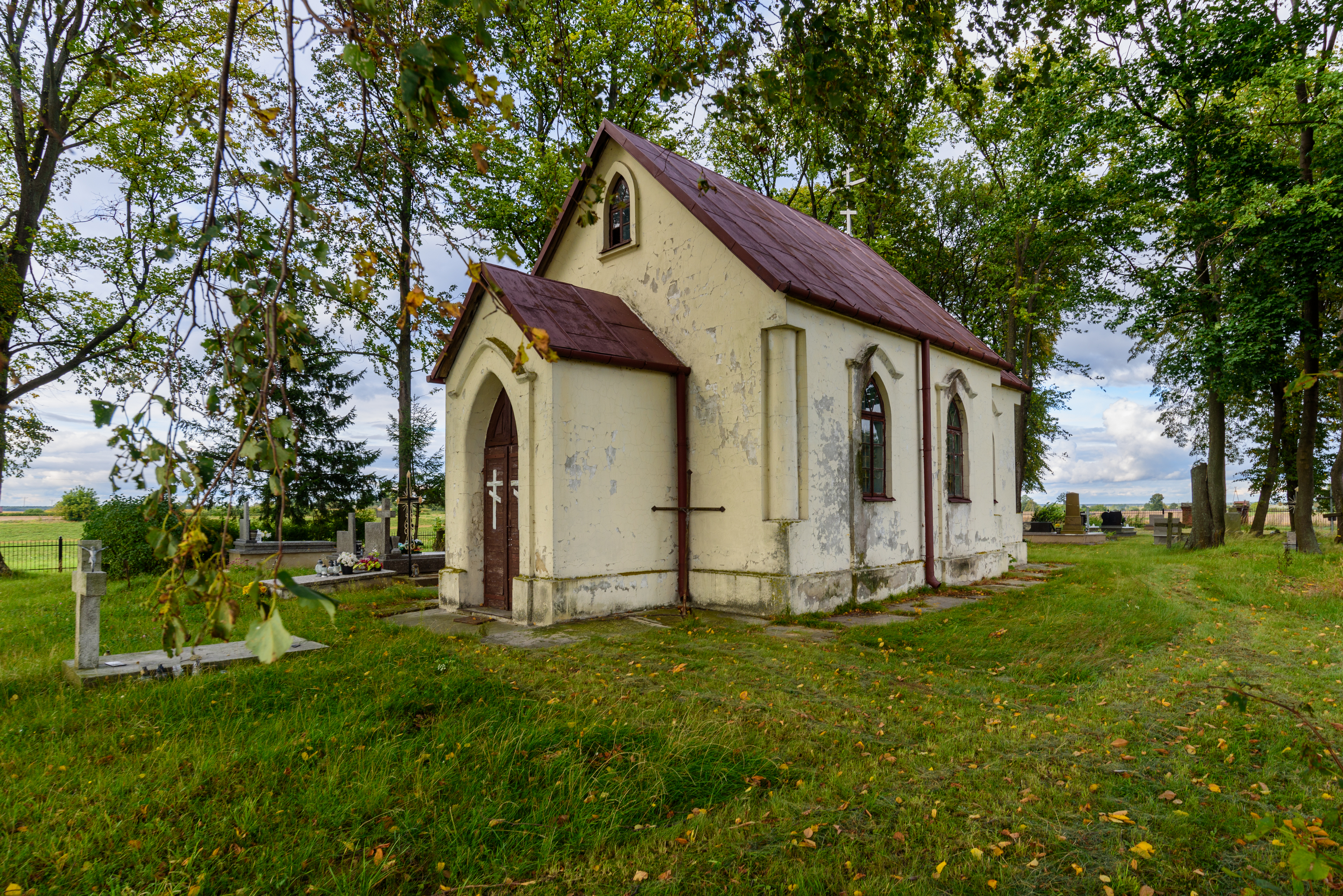
- General view
- Church of Saints Cosmas and Damian
- 51°27′53.0″N 22°50′32.8″E
- Location: Kolechowice; Poland
- Denomination: Eastern Orthodoxy
- Churchmanship: Polish Orthodox Church

History
- Dedication: Cosmas and Damian
- Dedicated: July 10, 1902

Architecture
- Functional status: active Orthodox church
- Style: eclecticism
- Completed: 1902

Specifications
- Materials: brick

Administration
- Diocese: Diocese of Lublin and Chełm

The Church of Saints Cosmas and Damian (originally Saints Anthony of the Caves and Martyr Sophia) is an Orthodox filial church in Kolechowice, Lublin Voivodeship, Poland. It belongs to the Cathedral Parish of the Transfiguration in Lublin, within the Lublin Deanery of the Diocese of Lublin and Chełm of the Polish Orthodox Church.

The Orthodox parish in Kolechowice was established in the 14th century. The church was built in 1902 on the grave of Zofia Dudzińska, the wife of the long-serving parson, Father Antoni Dudziński, who also financed the construction of the building. The church's original patrons were the namesakes of the Dudzińskis. At the time of its construction, the cemetery church was a filial church to the local parish church, built in 1883. Following the destruction of the parish church during the revindication and Polonization campaign, the cemetery chapel assumed the dedication and functions of the destroyed temple, also receiving its salvaged furnishings.

The church in Kolechowice was closed after World War II following the resettlement of the Ukrainian Orthodox population. Since then, due to the almost complete absence of local faithful, services have been held occasionally by clergy from Włodawa or Lublin.

The church is located within the Orthodox cemetery, 300 meters west of the main road running through the village.

== History ==
=== First churches in Kolechowice ===
The earliest mention of an Orthodox pastoral center in Kolechowice (historically referred to as Kolochowice) dates back to the 13th century, while the oldest reference to the Church of Saints Cosmas and Damian comes from 1531. However, it is generally accepted that the parish operated from the 14th century and was part of the Lublin Deanery (protopope jurisdiction). This church survived until the Tatar invasion in 1668, during which it was completely destroyed.

A new church was built in 1696. Although situated within the territory of the Eparchy of Chełm–Belz, it retained the Orthodox faith due to a privilege granted by King John III Sobieski. The church's benefactor was Jan Karol Daniłowicz (or Danielewicz), the starosta of Parczew. By the 18th century, the Kolechowice church had deteriorated as the lessees of local royal estates avoided providing the funds necessary for its upkeep. During the same century, the church adopted the Union of Brest. In a visitation record from 1793, the parson was noted to have been ordained by Uniate Bishop Porfiriusz Skarbek-Ważyński. Earlier, in the 1780s, the number of faithful in the Uniate parish in Kolechowice was estimated at 277.

By 1869, the church was in very poor technical condition. In 1875, following the administrative incorporation of the Uniate Diocese of Chełm into the Eparchy of Warsaw of the Russian Orthodox Church, the church in Kolechowice became Orthodox once again. A new church was consecrated in 1883, while the former Uniate church was dismantled. Materials from the dismantling were used to construct a bell tower for the new church. In the years leading up to the abolition of the Union, the church had 217 parishioners. Some remained with the imposed Orthodox faith, while others converted to Roman Catholicism after the 1905 Edict of Toleration.

=== Construction and functioning of the present-day church ===
The currently existing church in Kolechowice was built in 1902 as a tomb chapel for Zofia Dudzińska, the wife of the parson, Father Antoni Dudziński, who personally funded the construction at a cost of 4,000 rubles. Initially, the church was dedicated to Saints Anthony and Sophia. It was consecrated on 10 July 1902 by Bishop Herman of Lublin, assisted by four other Orthodox clergy from the Eparchy of Warsaw, in the presence of about 500 local faithful.

The cemetery church in Kolechowice initially served as an auxiliary temple to the parish church in the same village. In 1915, both churches were abandoned when the local Orthodox population fled during the wartime exodus. Neither church was included on the list of temples approved for reopening by the Ministry of Religious Affairs and Public Enlightenment in 1919, nor were they reopened in subsequent years. During this time, monks and missionaries from the St. Onuphrius Monastery in Jabłeczna ministered to the faithful in the village.

The cemetery chapel became the only Orthodox temple in Kolechowice after the destruction of the 1883 parish church during the revindication and Polonization campaign in 1938. Pastoral activity ceased entirely after 1945, following Operation Vistula, during which the Orthodox Ukrainian population of the region was forcibly resettled. From then on, services were held only occasionally by clergy from churches in Lublin or Włodawa.

In 1983, the Polish Orthodox Church obtained permission from local authorities to reopen the parish in Kolechowice. Some revival of spiritual life occurred after 1985, and in 1987, following renovations, the church in Kolechowice was reconsecrated. However, with almost no Orthodox faithful remaining in the village, services continue to be held irregularly, primarily on the church's patronal feast day.

== Architecture ==
The church in Kolechowice is a three-part structure consisting of a nave, a church porch, and a chancel, and it is oriented. The building is single-story with an attic and has a gable roof covered with sheet metal (originally roof tiles). Initially, the church featured a single dome. It was constructed from fired brick, plastered, and whitewashed. The front façade is single-axis with a single door opening, while the rear façade is also single-axis, featuring a small window and a niche containing an Orthodox cross. The side façades are three-axis. All windows and doors are pointed-arch in design.

The church's furnishings include religious items and liturgical utensils transferred from the parish church of Saints Cosmas and Damian, destroyed in 1938.

The church, along with the cemetery, was added to the register of historic monuments on 25 September 1989 under entry number A/982.
