= Laski, Parczew County =

Laski
- Village
- Location within Poland
- Coordinates: 51°36′29″N 22°51′21″E
- Country: Poland
- Voivodeship: Lublin
- County: Parczew
- Gmina: Parczew

Laski (Polish pronunciation: [ˈlaskʲi]) is a village in the administrative district of Gmina Parczew, within Parczew County, Lublin Voivodeship, in eastern Poland. It lies approximately 3 kilometres (2 mi) south of Parczew and 45 km (28 mi) north-east of the regional capital Lublin.
