= Buradów =

- Village
- Location within Poland
- Coordinates: 51°35′N 22°51′E
- Country: Poland
- Voivodeship: Lublin
- County: Parczew
- Gmina: Parczew

Buradów [buˈraduf] is a village in the administrative district of Gmina Parczew, within Parczew County, Lublin Voivodeship, in eastern Poland. It lies approximately 6 kilometres (4 mi) south of Parczew and 42 km (26 mi) north-east of the regional capital Lublin.
