= Królewski Dwór, Lublin Voivodeship =

Królewski Dwór
- Village
- Location within Poland
- Coordinates: 51°39′25″N 22°52′9″E
- Country: Poland
- Voivodeship: Lublin
- County: Parczew
- Gmina: Parczew

Królewski Dwór (Polish pronunciation: [kruˈlɛfskʲi ˈdvur]) is a village in the administrative district of Gmina Parczew, within Parczew County, Lublin Voivodeship, in eastern Poland. It lies approximately 3 kilometres (2 mi) north of Parczew and 50 km (31 mi) north-east of the regional capital Lublin.
