= Sowin, Lublin Voivodeship =

Sowin
- Village
- Location within Poland
- Coordinates: 51°36′55″N 22°54′48.8″E
- Country: Poland
- Voivodeship: Lublin
- County: Parczew
- Gmina: Parczew

Sowin [ˈsɔvin] is a village in the administrative district of Gmina Parczew, within Parczew County, Lublin Voivodeship, in eastern Poland. It lies approximately 4 kilometres (2 mi) south-east of Parczew and 48 km (30 mi) north-east of the regional capital Lublin.
