= Przewłoka, Parczew County =

Przewłoka
- Village
- Location within Poland
- Coordinates: 51°39′0″N 22°59′0″E
- Country: Poland
- Voivodeship: Lublin
- County: Parczew
- Gmina: Parczew
- Time zone: UTC+1 (CET)
  - Summer (DST): UTC+2 (CEST)

Przewłoka [pʂɛˈvwɔka] is a village in the administrative district of Gmina Parczew, within Parczew County, Lublin Voivodeship, in eastern Poland. It lies approximately 9 kilometres (6 mi) east of Parczew and 54 km (34 mi) north-east of the regional capital Lublin.

== History ==
Three Polish citizens were murdered by Nazi Germany in the village during World War II.
