= Michałówka, Parczew County =

Michałówka
- Village
- Location within Poland
- Coordinates: 51°37′43″N 22°57′24″E
- Country: Poland
- Voivodeship: Lublin
- County: Parczew
- Gmina: Parczew
- Population: 850

Michałówka [mixaˈwufka] is a village in the administrative district of Gmina Parczew, within Parczew County, Lublin Voivodeship, in eastern Poland. It lies approximately 7 kilometres (4 mi) east of Parczew and 51 km (32 mi) north-east of the regional capital Lublin.

In 2005 the village had a population of 850.
