= Tyśmienica =

Tyśmienica can refer to:

- the town of Tyśmienica, Lublin Voivodeship, Poland
- the Polish river Tyśmienica (Wieprz)
- the town of Tysmenytsia, Ukraine
