= Jasionka, Lublin Voivodeship =

Jasionka
- Village
- Location within Poland
- Coordinates: 51°40′N 22°56′E
- Country: Poland
- Voivodeship: Lublin
- County: Parczew
- Gmina: Parczew
- Population: 870

Jasionka [jaˈɕɔnka] is a village in the administrative district of Gmina Parczew, within Parczew County, Lublin Voivodeship, in eastern Poland. It lies approximately 6 kilometres (4 mi) north-east of Parczew and 53 km (33 mi) north-east of the regional capital Lublin.
