= Komarne =

- Village
- Location within Poland
- Coordinates: 51°36′22.1″N 22°49′39.5″E
- Country: Poland
- Voivodeship: Lublin
- County: Parczew
- Gmina: Parczew

Komarne [kɔˈmarnɛ] is a village in the administrative district of Gmina Parczew, within Parczew County, Lublin Voivodeship, in eastern Poland. It lies approximately 5 kilometres (3 mi) south-west of Parczew and 44 km (27 mi) north-east of the regional capital Lublin.
