= Wola Przewłocka =

- Village
- Location within Poland
- Coordinates: 51°38′N 22°59′E
- Country: Poland
- Voivodeship: Lublin
- County: Parczew
- Gmina: Parczew

Wola Przewłocka [ˈvɔla pʂɛˈvwɔt͡ska] is a village in the administrative district of Gmina Parczew, within Parczew County, Lublin Voivodeship, in eastern Poland. It lies approximately 9 kilometres (6 mi) east of Parczew and 52 km (32 mi) north-east of the regional capital Lublin.
