= Wierzbówka, Lublin Voivodeship =

Wierzbówka
- Village
- Location within Poland
- Coordinates: 51°39′45″N 22°53′54.5″E
- Country: Poland
- Voivodeship: Lublin
- County: Parczew
- Gmina: Parczew

Wierzbówka [vjɛʐˈbufka] is a village in the administrative district of Gmina Parczew, within Parczew County, Lublin Voivodeship, in eastern Poland. It lies approximately 4 kilometres (2 mi) north-east of Parczew and 52 km (32 mi) north-east of the regional capital Lublin.
