= Szytki =

Coordinates: 51.6205°N 22.9371°E

- Village
- Location within Poland
- Country: Poland
- Voivodeship: Lublin
- County: Parczew
- Gmina: Parczew

Szytki [ˈʂɨtki] is a village in the administrative district of Gmina Parczew, within Parczew County, Lublin Voivodeship, in eastern Poland.
