= Babianka =

- Village
- Location within Poland
- Coordinates: 51°31′N 22°49′E
- Country: Poland
- Voivodeship: Lublin
- County: Parczew
- Gmina: Parczew

Babianka [baˈbjaŋka] is a village in the administrative district of Gmina Parczew, within Parczew County, Lublin Voivodeship, in eastern Poland. It lies approximately 14 kilometres (9 mi) south of Parczew and 35 km (22 mi) north-east of the regional capital Lublin.
