= Zaniówka =

- Village
- Location within Poland
- Coordinates: 51°40′N 23°0′E
- Country: Poland
- Voivodeship: Lublin
- County: Parczew
- Gmina: Parczew

Zaniówka [zaˈɲufka] is a village in the administrative district of Gmina Parczew, within Parczew County, Lublin Voivodeship, in eastern Poland. It lies approximately 10 kilometres (6 mi) east of Parczew and 56 km (35 mi) north-east of the regional capital Lublin.

== Recent discoveries ==
In March 2023, a treasure hoard weighing 3 kg was uncovered in a ceramic jar which contains 1,000 crowns and Polish-Lithuanian schillings from the 17th century.
