= Ostrów Lubelski =

Town in Lublin Voivodeship, Poland

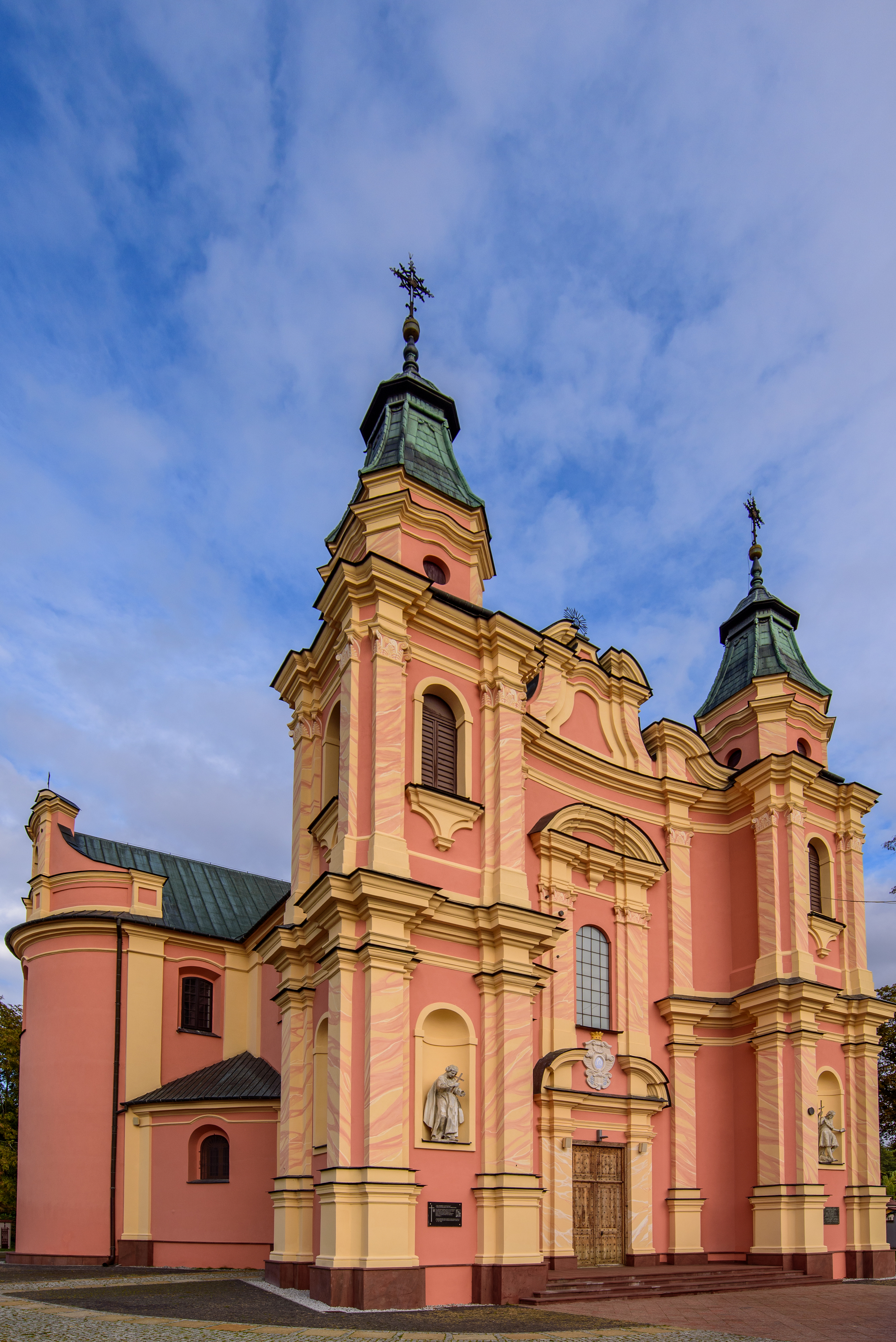
- Baroque Immaculate Conception church in Ostrów Lubelski

- Coat of arms

- Location within Poland
- Coordinates: 51°29′28″N 22°51′18″E
- Country: Poland
- Voivodeship: Lublin
- County: Lubartów
- Gmina: Ostrów Lubelski
- Town rights: 1548-1864, 1919

Government
  - Mayor: Włodzimierz Kołton (Ind.)

Area
  - Total: 29.77 km^{2} (11.49 sq mi)

Population (2006)
  - Total: 2,245
  - Density: 75.41/km^{2} (195.3/sq mi)
- Time zone: UTC+1 (CET)
  - Summer (DST): UTC+2 (CEST)
- Postal code: 21-110
- Area code: +48 81
- Car plates: LLB
- Website: https://www.ostrowlubelski.pl/index.php?lang=pl

Ostrów Lubelski [ˈɔstruf luˈbɛlskʲi] is a town in Gmina Ostrów Lubelski in Lubartów County, Lublin Voivodeship in Poland.

== Geography ==
Within the territory of the town and commune there are three lakes: Miejskie Lake, Kleszczów Lake and Czarne Lake. The commune is a typically agricultural area. It is constituted by 1,009 farms and 167 plots of ground. Ostrów Lubelski belongs to the historic province of Lesser Poland. The majority of farms are not concentrated on one particular kind of production; some specialise in cattle breeding for export, others in poultry breeding (geese, ducks), and yet others in pig breeding. Climate and water supplies are favourable for agriculture. In addition to grain, farms also grow herbs (thyme, lovage, camomile and mallow) and oil plants.

== Etymology ==
"Ostrów" derives from a Slavic word meaning "island".

== History ==
=== Establishment and early history ===
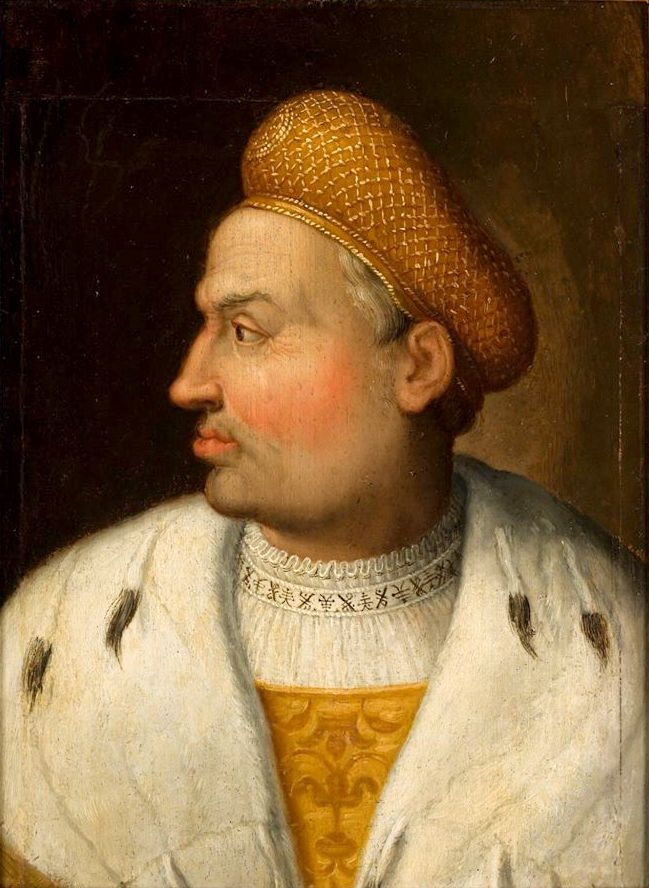
Polish King Sigismund I the Old vested Ostrów with town rights in 1548

On 25 January 1548, King Sigismund the Old granted a foundation privilege to Ostrów along with a privilege of hereditary office to Wacław Grzymała, a nobleman. At that time the area of Ostrów stretched over 1985 hectares. Ostrów became a royal town, holding a right to organise Saturday markets and collecting duty on the road from Lublin to Parczew. The fact that it was located on the Polish-Lithuanian route was advantageous for the development of trade and consequently the town. Administratively it was located in the Lublin Voivodeship in the Lesser Poland Province of the Kingdom of Poland.

In 1565 the population of Ostrów numbered about 1800 inhabitants, mostly Poles. It was one of the five most densely populated towns in the Lublin Voivodeship at that time. Apart from Lublin, Kazimierz Dolny was another town with a bigger population than Ostrów. Łuków and Parczew had nearly the same number of inhabitants. In 1589, in order to increase colonisation, King Sigismund III granted Ostrów the right to organise three markets a week. In spite of that, the importance of Ostrów decreased in the following decade. Cossack and Swedish invasions during the period known as Deluge as well as numerous conflicts and the greed of starosties resulted in a considerable deterioration of the town. The devastation of Ostrów by the troops of Moszkowski, Capitain of Horse, in 1657 was one of the major factors contributing to its collapse.

The population decreased to 300 people. The period of rule by Kings Augustus II and Augustus III witnessed further degradation of the town, in particular the years 1712–1717, when its inhabitants were forced to bear the expense of maintaining troops, although Ostrów was never a battlefield. This situation resulted in the mass exodus of its inhabitants. In 1718 the population of Ostrów numbered only 20.

=== Late modern period ===
The town was annexed by Austria in the Third Partition of Poland in 1795. Following the Austro-Polish War of 1809 it was included in the short-lived Polish Duchy of Warsaw, and after its dissolution it fell to the Russian Partition in 1815. The administrative status of Ostrów altered several times. It functioned as a royal town until 1864, when the Russian government stripped its town rights, and renamed it into a settlers commune. In 1923 a part of Tyśmienica commune was annexed to Ostrów commune. The commune population numbered over 8,000 people in 1923. During the First World War Ostrów was completely devastated and its population decreased to 2,100 inhabitants. The Germans, who occupied it for four years (1914–1918), did not permit to rebuild it. The census of 1919 recorded 4,648 people. At that time Ostrów was a village commune. After Poland regained its independence in 1918, the inhabitants of Ostrów pronounced their plea for Ostrów to regain its status as a town.

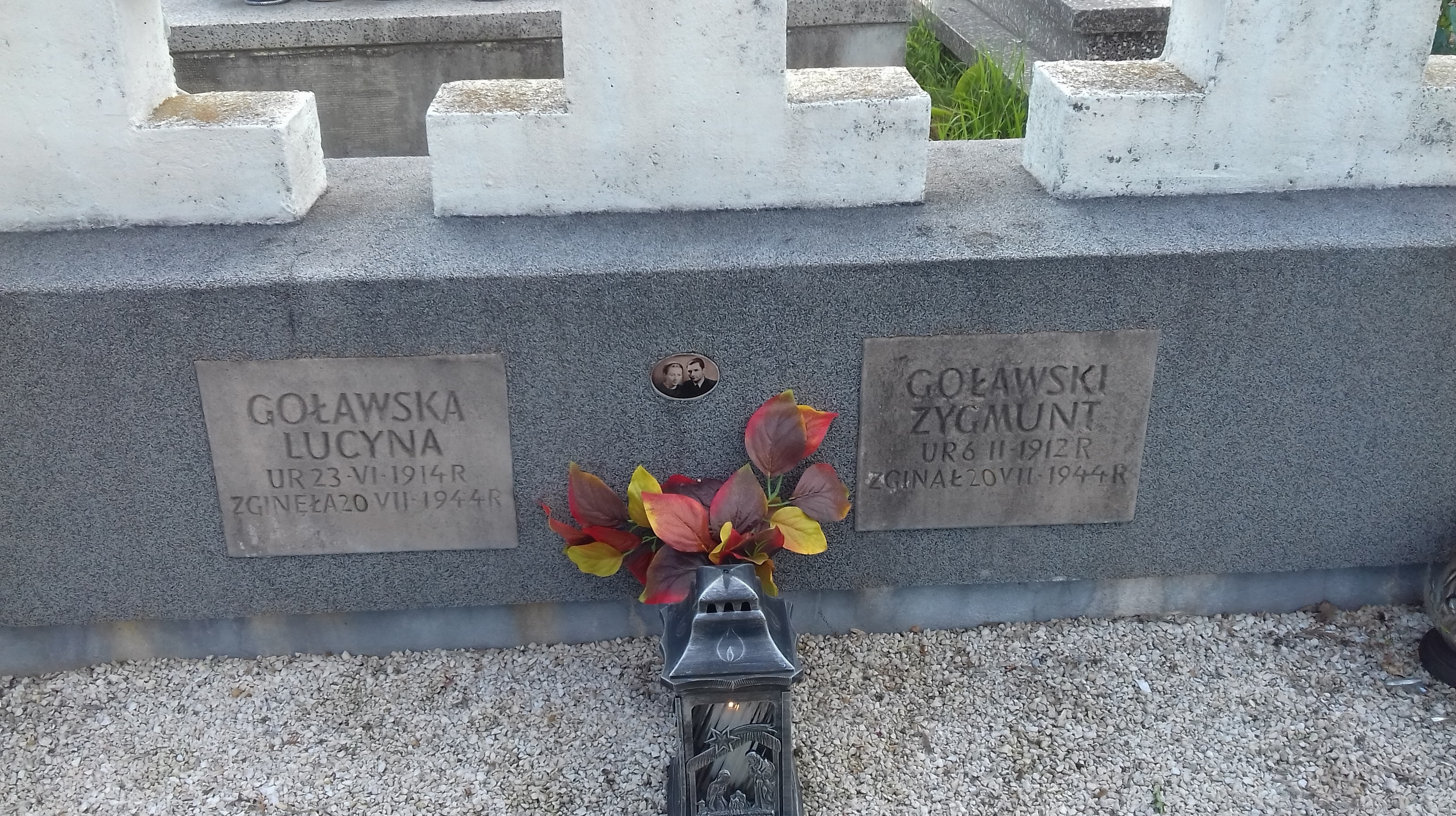
Graves of Poles killed in World War II

On the strength of the Decree of the Minister of Internal Affairs, Thugutt, by the terms of the Resolution of the Executive Seym of 22 July 1919, by the Decree of the State Commander of 4 February 1919 town rights of Ostrów were restored. Municipal administration was formed. The first election to the Town Council took place in 1920 and Aleksander Samulik became a mayor of Ostrów. In the same year, Ostrów was completely devastated and robbed by the Soviets during the Polish–Soviet War, depriving its inhabitants of all their property. The town suffered from the aftermath of the German-Russian war. Even a church was not saved. To commemorate this occasion bullets were built in the church walls. The period between the First World War and the Second World War was a period of prosperity. Ostrów was rebuilt and developed (concrete pavements along town squares, a bridge over the Tyśmienica, a school, community house, and fourteen new streets). At that time Ostrów was much overpopulated.

In 1928 fire destroyed its buildings. In 1930, 4,879 people lived there, including a high percentage of the Jewish population. While Poles were mostly peasants, local Jews took up crafts and trade. An impression of the life of the Jewish population can be gained from their memorial (Yizkor) book.

The cultural and economic development of Ostrów was terminated by the outbreak of the Second World War. During the German occupation, the entire Jewish population was murdered in the Holocaust. German occupation ended in July 1944.

== Cuisine ==
Among the protected traditional local foods, as designated by the Ministry of Agriculture and Rural Development of Poland, are:

- Buckwheat honey, typical to the Lublin Region including Ostrów Lubelski. Rich in magnesium, iron, vitamin C and protein, it is used to treat a wide range of diseases.
- Pasztecik z grzybami, a baked puff pastry stuffed with mushrooms, onions, olive oil and spices, sprinkled with cheese. It is a local dish of Ostrów Lubelski and nearby Lubartów.
