= Manasseh of Ilya =

Talmudist, rabbi, and writer (1767–1831)

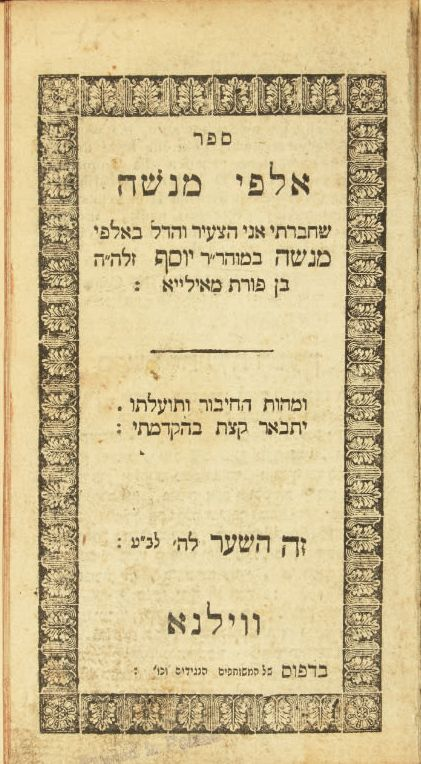
- Born: 1767; Smarhon
- Died: July 1831

Manasseh ben Joseph of Ilya (Menashe Ilyer, 1767–1831), known by his pseudonym Ben Porat, was a Talmudist, rabbi, and writer who has been described as a forerunner of the haskalah, or Jewish enlightenment. This characterization, which derives largely from an 1858 biography by the maskil Mordecai Plungian, was disputed by Manasseh's own students and has been contested by later traditional scholars.

== Personal life ==
Born in Smorgon, he pursued secular sciences and learning, such as higher mathematics, alongside his Talmudic studies. He was a student of the Vilna Gaon.

Married at 15 in an arranged marriage, he divorced shortly after, and remarried in 1784 to the daughter of a wealthy merchant from Ilya.

He died in 1831 in the second cholera pandemic.

Ezra Brudno was his great-grandson.

== Work ==
Manasseh was a conservative and a humanitarian, expressing ideas of unity and cooperation in secular and Jewish learning. His writings can be seen as a blending of Talmudic thought and European enlightenment philosophy. He can be seen as a precursor of modernity among Eastern European Jews. The characterization of Manasseh as a maskil, which derives largely from Mordecai Plungian's 1858 biography Ben Porat, was disputed in his own century by his students and has been contested by later traditional scholars, notably Rabbi David Kamenetsky in his 2023 edition of Manasseh's collected writings.

He was concerned with education of the Russian Jewish children. In his 1807 Pesher Davar, he wrote:

"...the Jews are divorced from real life and its practical needs and demands; that the leaders of the Jews are short-sighted men who, instead of enlightening their followers, darken their intellect with casuistic restrictions, in which each rabbi endeavors to outdo his predecessors and contemporaries. The wealthy class thinks only of its profits, and is not scrupulous with regard to the means of getting money. Even those who are honest and endeavor to help their poorer brethren do it in such an unintelligent way that they do harm rather than good. Instead of educating the children of the poor to become artisans, they add to the number of idlers, and are thus responsible for the dangerous consequences of such an education."

In interpreting rabbinic texts, Manasseh favored the plain philological sense (peshat) over homiletic interpretation (d'rash) — a method he wrote, in his Binat Mikra, that he had learned from the Vilna Gaon. Applying it, he was at times prepared to question interpretations of Rashi and rulings of the Shulchan Aruch, and even to interpret parts of the Mishnah differently from the explanation given in the Gemara. In his writings he continued to hold the Gaon in high esteem, stating in Alfei Menashe that but for Elijah of Vilna the Torah would have been forgotten in Israel. His criticism aroused strong opposition, and according to the Jewish Encyclopedia he would probably have been placed under a ban had not Joseph Mazel of Viasyn, an influential rabbi who took great interest in him, come to his rescue; Mazel also opened to him his extensive library of rabbinic and philosophical literature.

According to Ben Porat, an 1858 biography by the early Lithuanian maskil Mordecai Plungian on which later reference works drew, the Vilna Gaon distanced himself from Manasseh after learning that he had visited Shneur Zalman of Liadi, though Manasseh explained that only a love of knowledge had led him to the visit. The Orthodox community was suspicious of him for his interest in secular philosophy, mathematics, and astronomy, which he viewed as valuable knowledge in and of themself, and as such things that should be taught in Jewish schools as part of a good education. According to the same account, he planned to go to Berlin to study with Moses Mendelssohn, but his Orthodox coreligionists intervened with the Prussian authorities to deny him a passport, so he was forced to return home, but continued to study German, Polish, natural philosophy, and mechanics.

Plungian's portrayal was disputed from the outset. A review in the journal HaMaggid in 1858, attributed to the Vilna scholar Mattityahu Strashun, charged that the biography was full of falsehoods and had recast its subject as a maskil. Modern scholarship has likewise described Manasseh's attitude toward Hasidism as ambivalent rather than sympathetic. Rabbi David Kamenetsky, in the introduction to a 2023 critical edition of Manasseh's collected writings, argues that Plungian fabricated the account of a rupture with the Vilna Gaon, noting that Manasseh's works cite the Gaon with singular reverence — crediting him with restoring study of the plain sense of the text — and that Rabbi David Luria transmitted traditions about the Gaon in Manasseh's name; a responsum preserved in the Sdei Chemed records that the Gaon described Manasseh to his students as a great gaon. A note in the rabbinic journal Ha-Peles (1902–03) rejected Ben Porat's claim that Manasseh had scoffed at the Kabbalists, observing that Alfei Menashe engages deeply with kabbalistic literature. In his 1903 approbation to the posthumous second volume of Alfei Menashe, Rabbi Chaim Ozer Grodzinski wrote that publication of Manasseh's manuscripts would demonstrate that views foreign to his spirit had been groundlessly attributed to him.

He was friends with Judah Löb of Kovno, Samuel Eliasberg, and Wolf Adelsohn.

To support himself he worked at times as a private tutor in Russia and Galicia, and he is credited with inventing several agricultural machines, which did not catch on. He advocated for Jews to become craftspeople rather than tradesmen, and traveled to cheders to encourage students to study mathematics and science.

In 1827 the Jews of his town elected him as their rabbi, but he resigned after about a year, refusing to be involved in mobilizing Cantonists. Most of his unpublished manuscripts were destroyed in a fire in Ilya in 1884; some extracts were published in a second volume of Alfei Menasheh (1904) by his grandson Isaac Spalter, who headed a yeshiva in Smorgon.

== Works ==
- Pesher Davar [The Solution of the Problem] (Vilna, 1807). Many rabbis destroyed the book and it alienated some of his friends and disciples
- Binat Miḳra, (Grodno, 1818)
- Samma-de-Ḥayye [The Elixir of Life], written in Yiddish for general audiences, an educational text
- Sheḳel ha-Ḳodesh, (Shklov, 1823), a defense of his views
- Alfe Menashsheh [The Teachings of Menashe] (Vilna, 1822, republished in Warsaw 1860). Samuel Katzenellenbogen threatened to burn it if he did not remove a section about amending rabbinical teachings.

== Bibliography ==
- Mordecai Plungian, Sefer ben Porat, Vilna, 1858.
- Golubov, R. Manasseh ben Porat, in Voskhod, 1900, xi. 77.
- Alfei Menashe at Hebrewbooks.org: Part one, Part two; Binat Mikra at Hebrewbooks.org.
