= Jamy, Lublin Voivodeship =

Jamy
- Village
- Location within Poland
- Coordinates: 51°30′31″N 22°49′28″E
- Country: Poland
- Voivodeship: Lublin
- County: Lubartów
- Gmina: Ostrów Lubelski

Jamy [ˈjamɨ] is a village in the administrative district of Gmina Ostrów Lubelski, within Lubartów County, Lublin Voivodeship, in eastern Poland.
