= Rudka Kijańska =

- Village
- Location within Poland
- Coordinates: 51°26′N 22°52′E
- Country: Poland
- Voivodeship: Lublin
- County: Lubartów
- Gmina: Ostrów Lubelski

Rudka Kijańska [ˈrutka kiˈjaɲska] is a village in the administrative district of Gmina Ostrów Lubelski, within Lubartów County, Lublin Voivodeship, in eastern Poland.
