= Kaznów, Lublin Voivodeship =

Kaznów
- Village
- Location within Poland
- Coordinates: 51°29′35″N 22°45′38″E
- Country: Poland
- Voivodeship: Lublin
- County: Lubartów
- Gmina: Ostrów Lubelski

Kaznów [ˈkaznuf] is a village in the administrative district of Gmina Ostrów Lubelski, within Lubartów County, Lublin Voivodeship, in eastern Poland.
