= Wólka Stara Kijańska =

- Village
- Location within Poland
- Coordinates: 51°24′15″N 22°49′13″E
- Country: Poland
- Voivodeship: Lublin
- County: Lubartów
- Gmina: Ostrów Lubelski
- Time zone: UTC+1 (CET)
  - Summer (DST): UTC+2 (CEST)

Wólka Stara Kijańska [ˈvulka ˈstara kiˈjaɲska] is a village in the administrative district of Gmina Ostrów Lubelski, within Lubartów County, Lublin Voivodeship, in eastern Poland.

== History ==
Three Polish citizens were murdered by Nazi Germany in the village during World War II.
