= Mordecai Plungian =

- Born: 13 September 1814
- Died: 27 November 1883 (aged 69)

Mordecai Plungian (Marcus Plungianski; 1814-1883) was a Lithuanian rabbi, Talmudist, and Hebrew author associated with the maskilim, or the writers of the haskalah movement (the Jewish enlightenment).

== Biography ==
He was born in Plungė and built a reputation as a Talmudist at a young age before moving to Troki, where his new ideas offended the ultra-conservatives, so he moved to Wilna, where he gave rabbinical lectures and began secular studies, including European literature and languages. He got a job as a high school teacher before becoming an instructor of Talmud at the rabbinical seminary in 1867. The seminary closed in 1873, and he worked as a corrector in a printing office.

Plungian was a descendant of Mordecai Jaffe. He was a friend of Alexander Harkavy.

Plungian was accused by the liberals of being a conservative, but angered the Orthodox as well who accused him of heresy. His 1856 book Ben Porat was the subject of a censorship controversy, but he received assistance from Abraham Firkovich. The work was a biography of Manasseh of Ilya. While he distanced himself from the extreme end of the haskalah, he also had to destroy the second part of the manuscript to placate the religious contingent. He also wrote poetry, commentaries on Ecclesiastes and the Song of Songs, and works on the Mishnah.

He died in Wilna in 1883.

== Works and further reading ==
- Talpiyyot (Wilna, 1849), on the hermeneutic rule Gezerah Shawah in the Babylonian Talmud
- Ben Porat (1856), biography of Manasseh of Ilya
- Shebeṭ Eloah (ib. 1862), arguments against blood libel
- Or Boḳer (ib. 1868), critical treatises on the Masorah as interpreted in the Talmud
- Kerem li-Shelomoh (1857), a commentary on Kohelet
  - Plungian, Mordecai (1837). כרם לשלמה (in Hebrew). Rom.
  - "A vineyard for Solomon by Mordechai ben Rabbi Shlomo Plungian כרם לשלמה -- פלונגיאן, מרדכי ב"ר שלמה". HebrewBooks.org (in Hebrew).
- "מרדכי פלונגיאן - דף יוצר - פרויקט בן־יהודה Mordechai Plongian". benyehuda.org (in Hebrew).
- "Mordechai Plungian (1814-1883), 1878, notebook of sermons, poems, commentary". Center for Jewish History.
- National Library of Israel

== Jewish Encyclopedia/Encyclopedia Judaica bibliography ==
- Ha-Shaḥar, xi. 635;
- N. Nathanson, Sefat Emet, Warsaw, 1887;
- Zeitlin, Bibl. Post-Mendels. p. 272;
- Kerem Ḥemed, ix. 136;
- Ha-Meliẓ, 1883, Nos. 89, 91.
- N.Z. Golomb, in: Ha-Ẓefirah, no. 46 (1883);
- P. Smolenskin, in: Ha-Shaḥar, 11 (1883), 635–6;
- N. Nathansohn, Sefat Emet (1887).
