= Kolechowice-Folwark =

- Village
- Location within Poland
- Coordinates: 51°28′24″N 22°50′28″E
- Country: Poland
- Voivodeship: Lublin
- County: Lubartów
- Gmina: Ostrów Lubelski

Kolechowice-Folwark [kɔlɛxɔˈvit͡sɛ ˈfɔlvark] is a village in the administrative district of Gmina Ostrów Lubelski, within Lubartów County, Lublin Voivodeship, in eastern Poland.
