= Rozkopaczew =

- Village
- Location within Poland
- Coordinates: 51°25′N 22°51′E
- Country: Poland
- Voivodeship: Lublin
- County: Lubartów
- Gmina: Ostrów Lubelski

Population
  - Total: 1,100
- Time zone: UTC+1 (CET)
  - Summer (DST): UTC+2 (CEST)

Rozkopaczew [rɔskɔˈpat͡ʂɛf] is a village in the administrative district of Gmina Ostrów Lubelski, within Lubartów County, Lublin Voivodeship, in eastern Poland.

== History ==
Six Polish citizens were murdered by Nazi Germany in the village during World War II.
