= Koczergi =

Village in Parczew County, Poland

- Village
- Location within Poland
- Coordinates: 51°38′12.1″N 22°51′50.9″E
- Country: Poland
- Voivodeship: Lublin
- County: Parczew
- Gmina: Parczew
- Time zone: UTC+1 (CET)
  - Summer (DST): UTC+2 (CEST)

Koczergi [kɔˈt͡ʂɛrɡi] is a village in the administrative district of Gmina Parczew, within Parczew County, Lublin Voivodeship, in eastern Poland. It lies approximately 48 kilometres (30 mi) north-east of the regional capital Lublin.

== History ==
16 Polish citizens were murdered by Nazi Germany in the village during World War II.
