= Gmina Ostrów Lubelski =

Gmina Ostrów Lubelski Ostrów Lubelski Commune
- Gmina
- Coat of arms

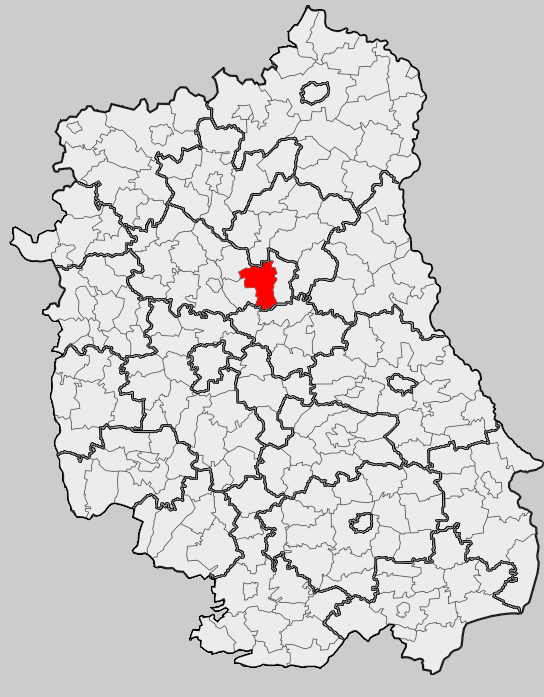
- Location within the county and voivodeship
- Coordinates (Ostrów Lubelski): 51°29′28″N 22°51′18″E
- Country: Poland
- Voivodeship: Lublin
- County: Lubartów
- Seat: Ostrów Lubelski

Area
  - Total: 121.7 km^{2} (47.0 sq mi)

Population (2015)
  - Total: 5,349
  - Density: 43.95/km^{2} (113.8/sq mi)
  - Urban: 2,146
  - Rural: 3,203
- Website: http://www.ostrowlubelski.lubelskie.pl/

Gmina Ostrów Lubelski is an urban-rural gmina (administrative district) in Lubartów County, Lublin Voivodeship, in eastern Poland. Its seat is the town of Ostrów Lubelski, which lies approximately 18 kilometres (11 mi) east of Lubartów and 34 km (21 mi) north-east of the regional capital Lublin.

The gmina covers an area of 121.7 square kilometres (47.0 sq mi), and as of 2006 its total population is 5,630 (out of which the population of Ostrów Lubelski amounts to 2,245, and the population of the rural part of the gmina is 3,385).

== Neighbouring gminas ==
Gmina Ostrów Lubelski is bordered by the gminas of Ludwin, Niedźwiada, Parczew, Serniki, Spiczyn and Uścimów.

== Villages ==
The gmina contains the following villages having the status of sołectwo: Bójki, Jamy, Kaznów, Kaznów-Kolonia, Kolechowice Drugie, Kolechowice Pierwsze, Kolechowice-Folwark, Kolechowice-Kolonia, Rozkopaczew (sołectwos: Rozkopaczew I and Rozkopaczew II), Rudka Kijańska and Wólka Stara Kijańska.

== Demography ==
2015	Total	Women	Men
Population	5349	2673	2676
Density	44.0	21.9	22.1

== Area ==
It spans an area of 121.7 square kilometers, including:

- Agricultural area: 68%
- Forest area: 18%
