= Ben-Porat =

Ben-Porat (Hebrew: בן-פורת) is a Hebrew language surname. The name is associated with the line "Ben Porat Yosef" from the Book of Genesis, Chapter 49, Verse 22, which is commonly used as a protection against the evil eye.

Notable people with the surname include:

- Miriam Ben-Porat (1918–2012), Israeli jurist
- Mordechai Ben-Porat (born 1923), Israeli politician
- Pinchas Ben-Porat (1914–1955), Israeli aviator
- Yoram Ben-Porat (1937–1992), Israeli economist and president of the Hebrew University of Jerusalem
- Ziva Ben-Porat, Israeli literary theorist

== See also ==
- Manasseh of Ilya, pseudonym
