= Kolechowice-Kolonia =

- Village
- Location within Poland
- Coordinates: 51°27′08″N 22°48′53″E
- Country: Poland
- Voivodeship: Lublin
- County: Lubartów
- Gmina: Ostrów Lubelski

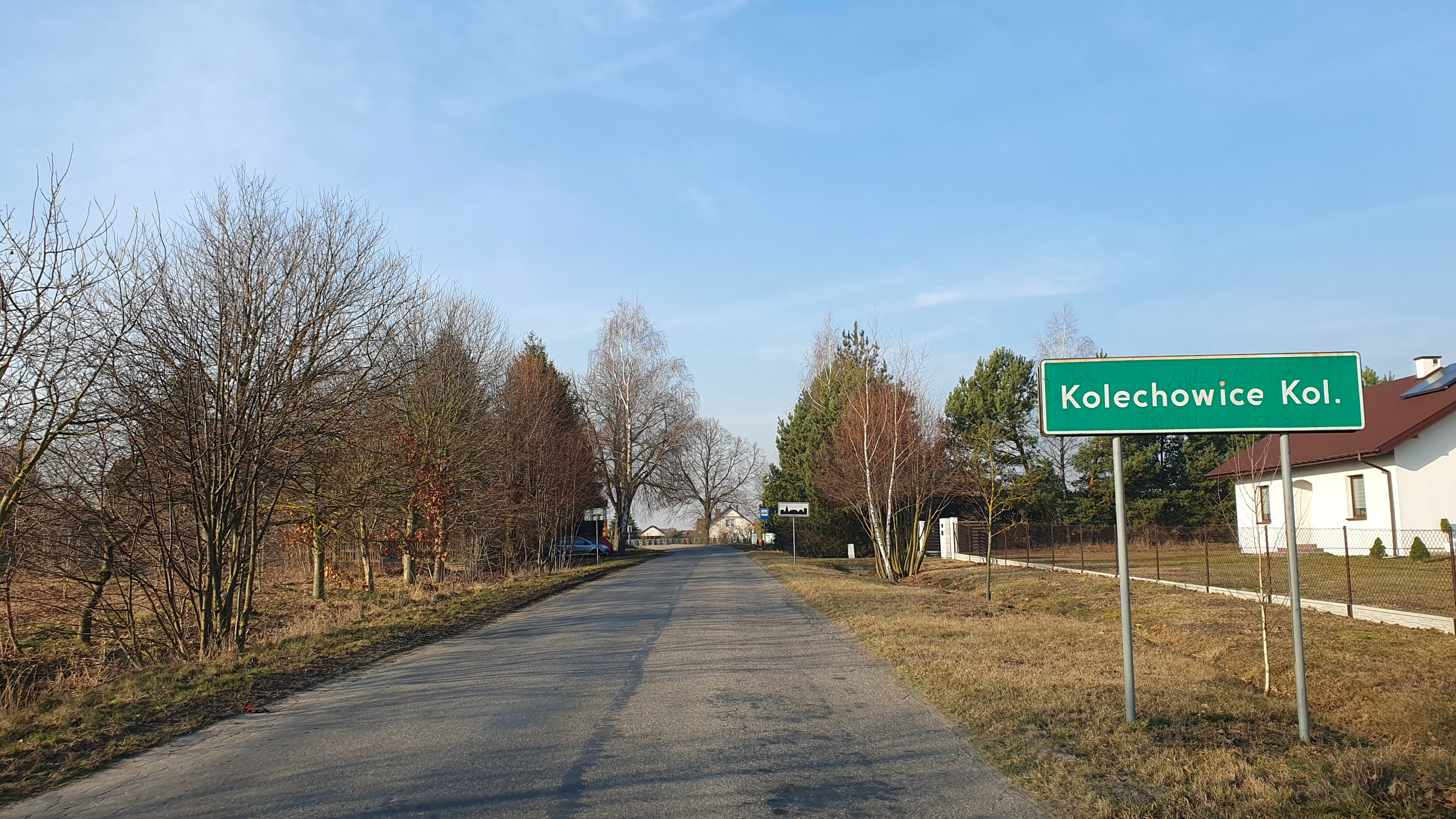
Kolechowice-Kolonia in 2025

Kolechowice-Kolonia [kɔlɛxɔˈvit͡sɛ kɔˈlɔɲa] is a village in the administrative district of Gmina Ostrów Lubelski, within Lubartów County, Lublin Voivodeship, in eastern Poland.
