= Gmina Parczew =

Gmina Parczew Parczew Commune
- Gmina
- Flag Coat of arms

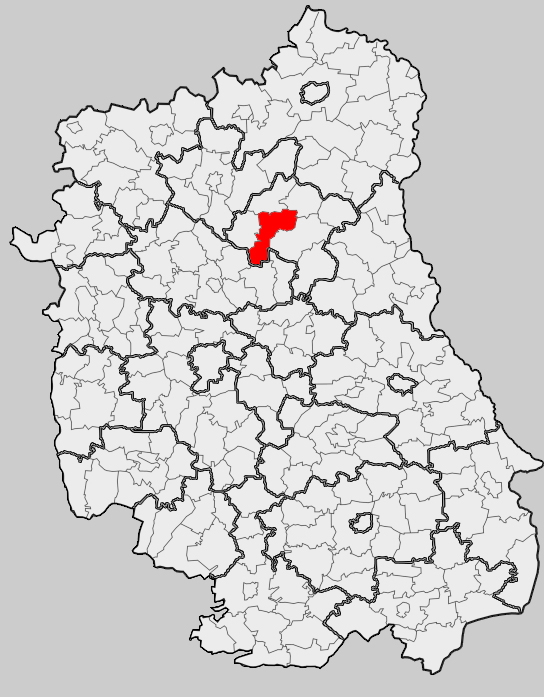
- Location within the county and voivodeship
- Coordinates (Parczew): 51°38′N 22°52′E
- Country: Poland
- Voivodeship: Lublin
- County: Parczew
- Seat: Parczew

Area
  - Total: 146.23 km^{2} (56.46 sq mi)

Population (2014)
  - Total: 14,812
  - Density: 101.29/km^{2} (262.35/sq mi)
  - Urban: 10,913
  - Rural: 3,899
- Website: http://www.parczew.com/

Gmina Parczew is an urban-rural gmina (administrative district) in Parczew County, Lublin Voivodeship, in eastern Poland. Its seat is the town of Parczew, which lies approximately 48 kilometres (30 mi) north-east of the regional capital Lublin.

The gmina covers an area of 146.23 square kilometres (56.5 sq mi), and as of 2006 its total population is 14,852 (out of which the population of Parczew amounts to 10,281, and the population of the rural part of the gmina is 4,571).

== Neighbouring gminas ==
Gmina Parczew is bordered by the gminas of Dębowa Kłoda, Jabłoń, Milanów, Niedźwiada, Ostrów Lubelski, Siemień and Uścimów.

== Villages ==
The gmina contains the following villages having the status of sołectwo: Babianka, Brudno, Buradów, Jasionka, Koczergi, Komarne, Królewski Dwór, Laski, Michałówka, Pohulanka, Przewłoka, Siedliki, Sowin, Tyśmienica, Wierzbówka, Wola Przewłocka and Zaniówka.
