= Kolechowice =

- Village
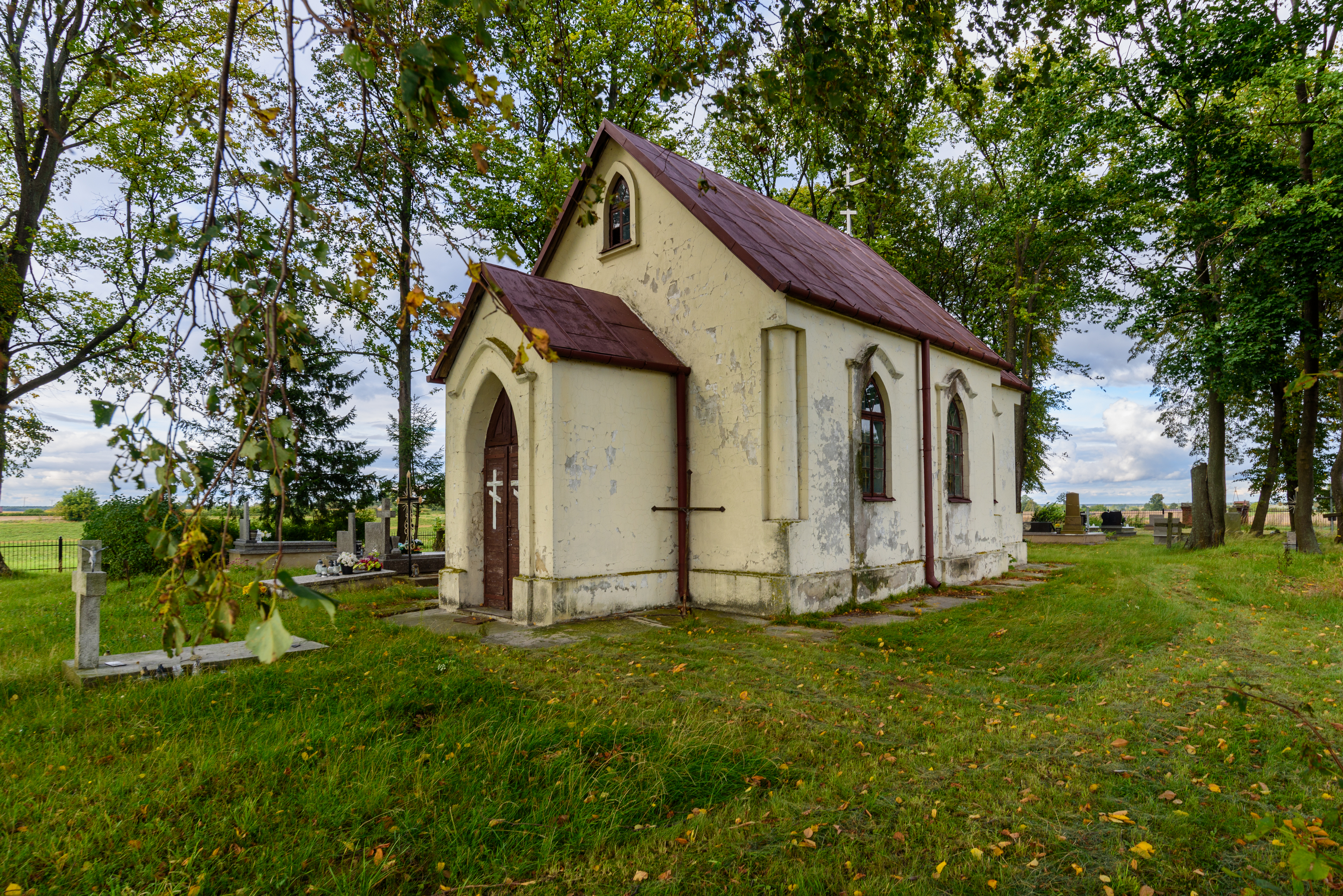
- Cemetery chapel in Kolechowice (2022)

- Location within Poland
- Coordinates: 51°28′07″N 22°50′56″E
- Country: Poland
- Voivodeship: Lublin
- County: Lubartów
- Gmina: Ostrów Lubelski
- Time zone: UTC+1 (CET)
  - Summer (DST): UTC+2 (CEST)

Kolechowice [kɔlɛxɔˈvit͡sɛ] is a village in the administrative district of Gmina Ostrów Lubelski, within Lubartów County, Lublin Voivodeship, in eastern Poland.

== History ==
Four Polish citizens were murdered by Nazi Germany in the village during World War II.
