= Bójki =

- Village
- Location within Poland
- Coordinates: 51°32′N 22°51′E
- Country: Poland
- Voivodeship: Lublin
- County: Lubartów
- Gmina: Ostrów Lubelski
- Time zone: UTC+1 (CET)
  - Summer (DST): UTC+2 (CEST)
- Vehicle registration: LLB

Bójki [ˈbui̯ki] is a village in the administrative district of Gmina Ostrów Lubelski, within Lubartów County, Lublin Voivodeship, in eastern Poland.

== History ==
Five Polish citizens were murdered by Nazi Germany in the village during World War II.
