= Ezra Brudno =

American writer

- Born: May 28, 1877; Valozhyn, Russian Empire
- Died: December 12, 1954 (aged 77); Cleveland, Ohio, US
- Occupation: Writer (novelist)
- Spouse: Rose Hess
- Children: 2
- Writing career
- Genres: History, fiction

Ezra Selig Brudno (May 28, 1877 – December 12, 1954) was a Jewish American author of fiction and non-fiction.

== Biography ==
Brudno was born in Valozhyn (present-day Belarus) in 1877. His parents were Isaac Brudno and Hannah Model. His family emigrated to the United States in 1891 where they settled in Ohio. He attended Adelbert College and Yale University where he obtained a law degree. He began practicing in Cleveland in 1901 and in 1909 became an assistant district attorney.

During his law practice he started to write. His first novel called The Fugitive was published in 1904. His literary efforts were published in Lippincott's Monthly Magazine and locally in the Jewish Review & Observer. In his writings he portrayed Judaism and Jewish culture as having little value and promoted the assimilation of Jews into western civilization.

In 1939, he wrote in response to a review of his book The Tether, "I do not believe that any writer can ever produce a piece of fiction without having some definite person or persons in mind, and very often they become a composite of a number of characters in real life, but there is always a germ of some fact back of every fictitious character."

Brudno married Rose Hess and they raised two children: Lincoln and Emily. He died in Shaker Heights, Ohio in 1954 at the age of 77.

== Works ==
- The Fugitive, (1904)
- The Little Conscript, (1905)
- The Tether, (1908)
- The Jugglers, (1920)
- The Sublime Jester, (1924)
- Ghost of Yesterday: A Reappraisal of Moral Values and of Accepted Standards in This Changing World, (1935)
