= Tyśmienica, Lublin Voivodeship =

Tyśmienica
- Village
- Location within Poland
- Coordinates: 51°33′45″N 22°50′15″E
- Country: Poland
- Voivodeship: Lublin
- County: Parczew
- Gmina: Parczew
- Population: 680

Tyśmienica [tɨɕmjɛˈnit͡sa] is a village in the administrative district of Gmina Parczew, within Parczew County, Lublin Voivodeship, in eastern Poland. It lies approximately 9 kilometres (6 mi) south of Parczew and 40 km (25 mi) north-east of the regional capital Lublin.
