= Parczew =

Town in Lublin Voivodeship, Poland

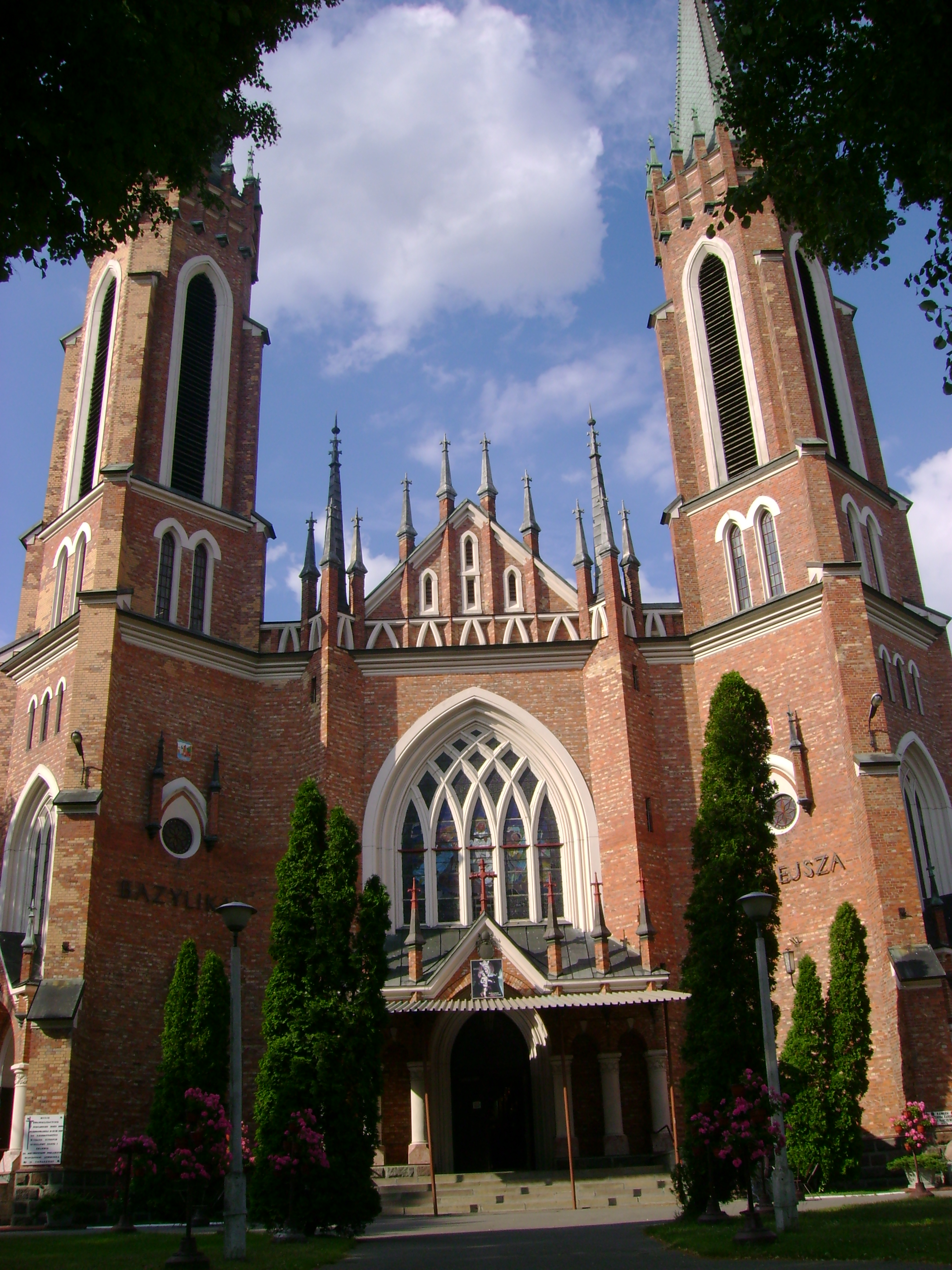
- Minor Basilica of Saint John the Baptist

- Flag Coat of arms

- Location within Poland Location within Lublin Voivodeship
- Coordinates: 51°38′N 22°52′E
- Country: Poland
- Voivodeship: Lublin
- County: Parczew County
- Gmina: Gmina Parczew
- Town rights: 1401

Government
  - Mayor: Paweł Kędracki (PiS)

Area
  - Total: 8.05 km^{2} (3.11 sq mi)

Population (2006)
  - Total: 10,281
  - Density: 1,280/km^{2} (3,310/sq mi)
- Time zone: UTC+1 (CET)
  - Summer (DST): UTC+2 (CEST)
- Postal code: 21-200
- Car plates: LPA
- Website: http://parczew.com

Parczew [ˈpart͡ʂɛf] is a town in eastern Poland, with a population of 10,281 (2006). It is the capital of Parczew County in the Lublin Voivodeship.

Parczew is a former royal town of Poland that played an important role during the Jagiellonian dynasty as a centre for councils and parliamentary sessions, including the session of 1564, which was decisive in Poland's continued adherence to Catholicism during the Protestant Reformation.

Parczew historically belongs to Lesser Poland (Małopolska) region. The town lies 60 kilometers north of Lublin, and 70 kilometers south of Biala Podlaska. It has a rail station on the secondary-importance line from Lublin to Łuków, which was inaugurated in 1898.

== Etymology ==
The name is of Polish origin, and comes from the Old Polish male name Parcz.

== History ==
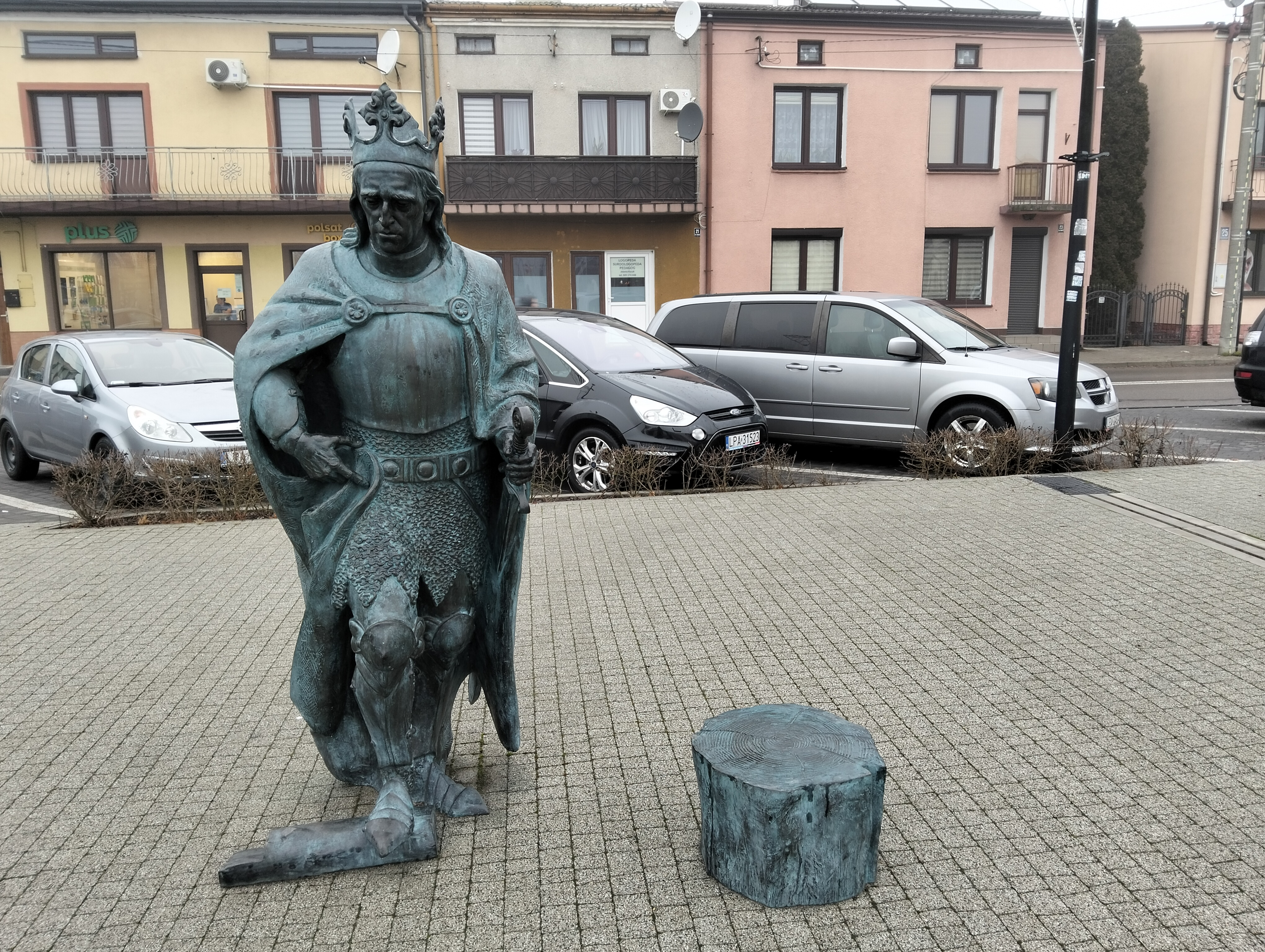
Statue of King Władysław II Jagiełło

The settlement of Parczew existed since the 12th century, lying near then-eastern border of the Kingdom of Poland. In 1401, it received Magdeburg rights town charter from King Władysław II Jagiełło. The union of Poland and Lithuania (see Union of Krewo) helped Parczew to develop, as it ceased to be a border town. The town was conveniently located on one of the routes joining the capitals of the two united nations - Kraków and Vilnius. In 1413, in an act of Władysław II Jagiełło and Vytautas, Parczew was designated, equally with Lublin, as a venue for councils and parliamentary sessions. The town emerged as one of the centers of political life of the two nations. Parczew was visited by all kings of the Jagiellonian dynasty. A Sejm of the Kingdom of Poland was convened in Parczew in 1564 for final decisions regarding the Polish–Lithuanian union. At the Sejm of 1564, King Sigismund II Augustus and the Polish Senate received the decrees of the Council of Trent from the apostolic nuncio Giovanni Francesco Commendone. The adoption of the decrees of the Council of Trent in Parczew was decisive in Poland's continued adherence to Catholicism during the Protestant Reformation.

Parczew was a royal town of Poland. Administratively, Parczew formed part of the Sandomierz Voivodeship until 1474, and then of the Lublin Voivodeship in the Lesser Poland Province. Parczew reached its peak of prosperity and importance in the 15th and 16th centuries, when it hosted councils of Polish kings and the nobility. The town had a defensive wall, with three gates, and a royal residence, where Polish kings stayed on their way to and from Vilnius. The town was the seat of a starosta, with a town hall located on the market square, two bath houses, four mills and breweries. In the 16th century, there were guilds of shoemakers, blacksmiths, tailors, furriers, and weavers. In the 16th century, it had three Roman Catholic churches, one Orthodox church, a synagogue, a school and a hospital.

In 1501, King John I Albert exempted Parczew from taxes to stimulate recovery after a Tatar raid. The town was again exempted from taxes in 1520, 1525, 1531, and 1533. In 1544, the town was raided and plundered by the Tatars. In 1655, it was seized, ransacked and burned by the Swedes (see Deluge). After the wars of the mid-17th century, the town did not recover until the reign of Stanisław August Poniatowski. The 1st Polish Infantry Regiment was stationed in the town in 1793.

During the Third Partition of Poland in 1795, it was annexed by Austria. It was regained by Poles following the Austro-Polish War of 1809, and included within the short-lived Duchy of Warsaw. After the duchy's dissolution, it was part of Russian-controlled Congress Poland. During the January Uprising, on 29 June 1863, it was the site of a skirmish between Polish insurgents and Russian troops. In 1898, the rail line from Lublin, via Parczew, to Łuków was built. In 1918, Poland regained independence and control of the town. During the Polish–Soviet War, the town was briefly occupied by the Russian invaders, before it was recaptured by the Poles on 16 August 1920.

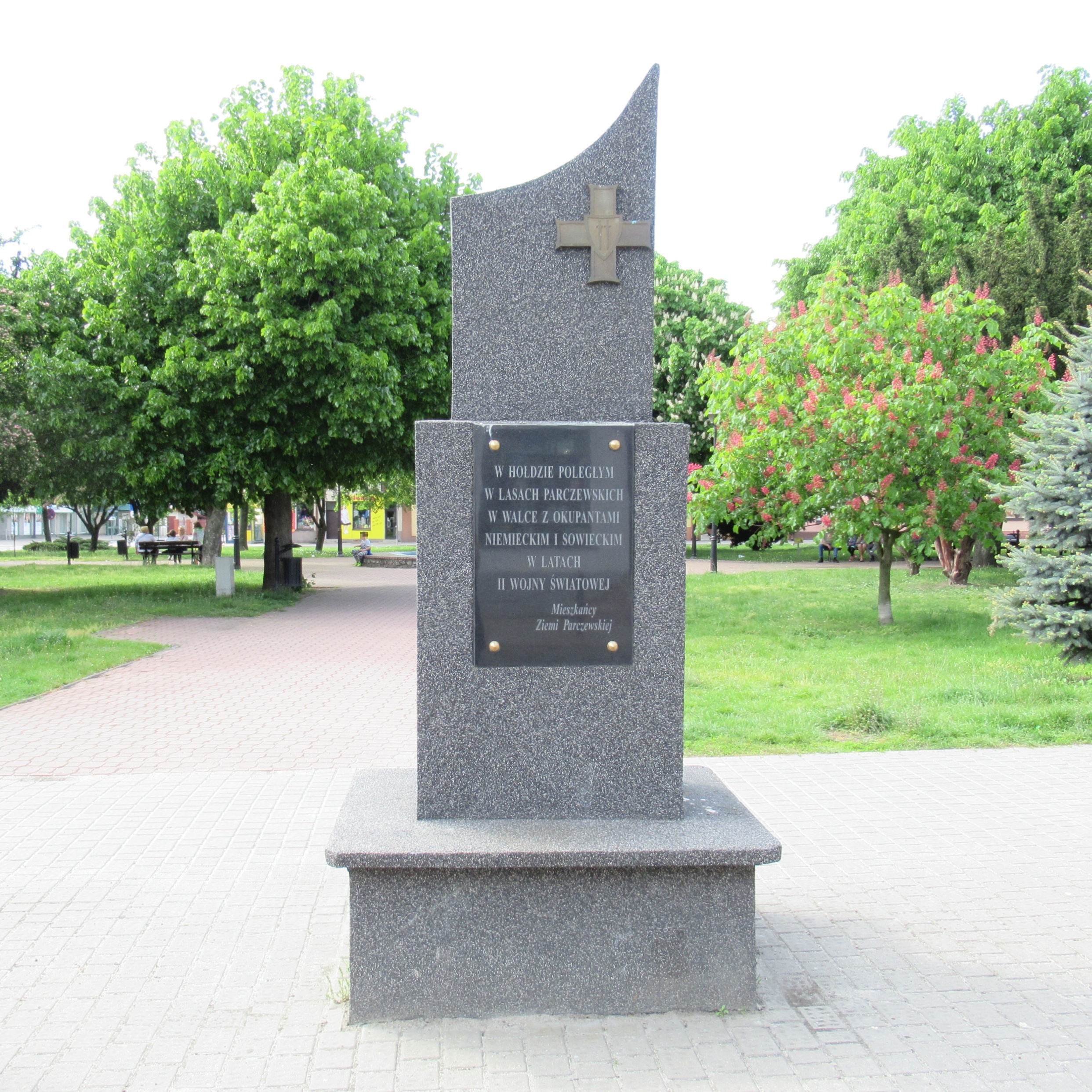
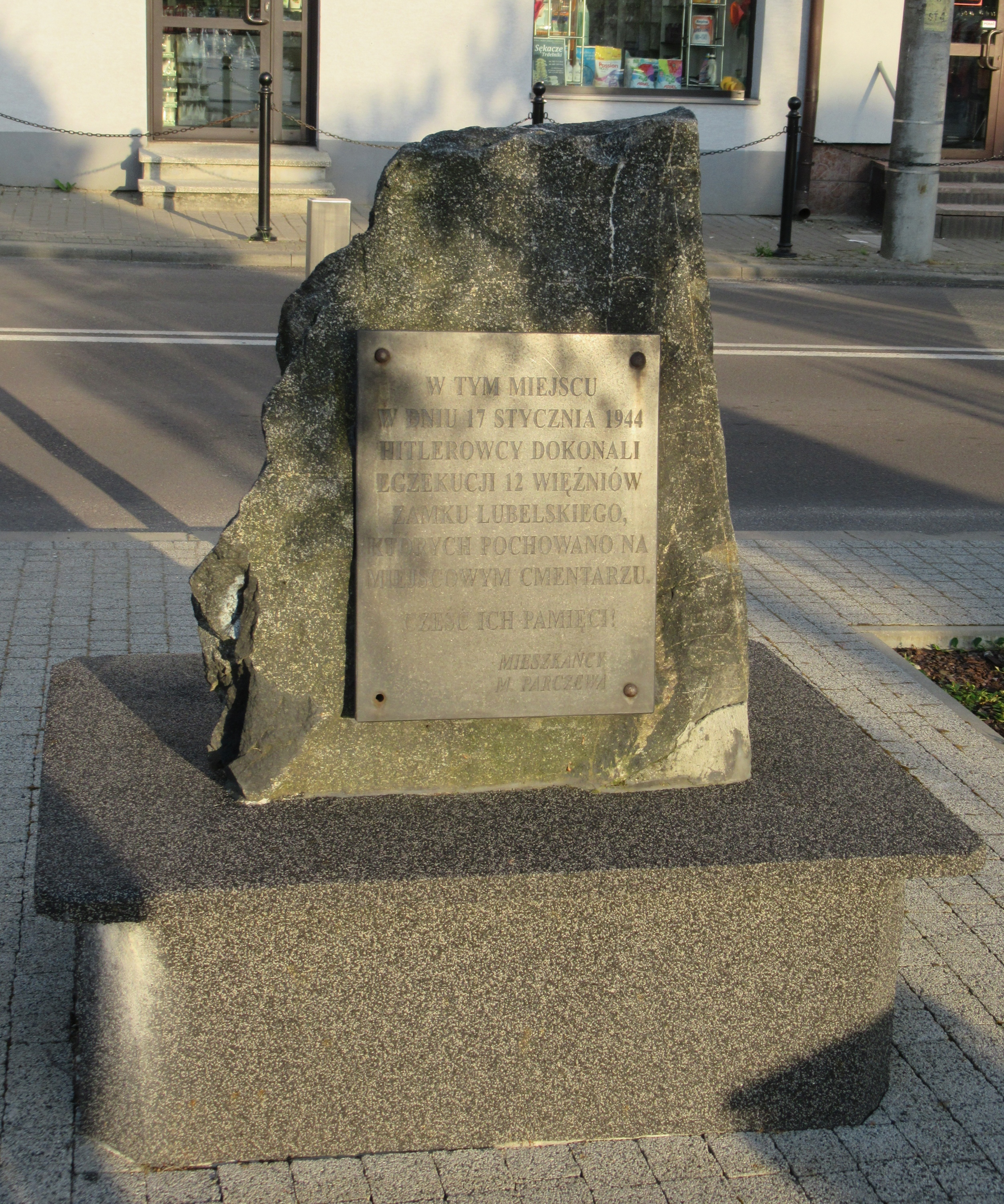
Memorials to fallen members of the local resistance and victims of a German-perpetrated massacre from 1944

Following the joint German-Soviet invasion of Poland, which started World War II in September 1939, the town was occupied by Germany. On 20 February 1940, the SS and Wehrmacht committed a massacre of 350 Polish prisoners-of-war of Jewish origin. It was a center of Polish resistance. In local forests, numerous Home Army and Armia Ludowa units operated. On 22 July 1944, Parczew was liberated by the Home Army, and in the summer of 1945, the anti-Communist unit of Leon Taraszkiewicz attacked a local Urząd Bezpieczeństwa prison.

In 1955, Parczew County was created, and in 2001, the town celebrated its 600th anniversary. From 1975 to 1998, it was administratively located in the Biała Podlaska Voivodeship.

== Demographics ==
Historical population

Year	Pop.	±%
1897	6,660	—
1910	7,753	+16.4%
1921	7,893	+1.8%
1931	9,943	+26.0%

Year	Pop.	±%
1950	5,709	−42.6%
1960	6,195	+8.5%
2010	10,048	+62.2%

=== Jews in Parczew ===
An organized Jewish community existed in the town since the early 16th century. Just before the outbreak of World War II the Jewish community numbered 5,000, more than half of the town's population. During the German occupation of Poland the Jews were first confined to a ghetto crammed with inhabitants of neighbouring settlements as well. In the course of the Holocaust, on 19 August 1942 the Nazi German Reserve Police Battalion 101 aided by the Trawniki men rounded up and deported 3,000 Jews to Treblinka extermination camp; 2,000 more Jews were loaded onto Holocaust trains and murdered upon arrival. The battalion returned to Parczew with the same company of Hiwis in October 1942. There were 5,000 more Jews in the ghetto. They were massacred in a mass shooting action and deported, at which point the town was declared Judenfrei ("free of Jews"). The Parczew partisans anti-Nazi fighter group operated in the forests around the town, which included Jewish men and women who managed to escape the slaughter.

== Sights ==
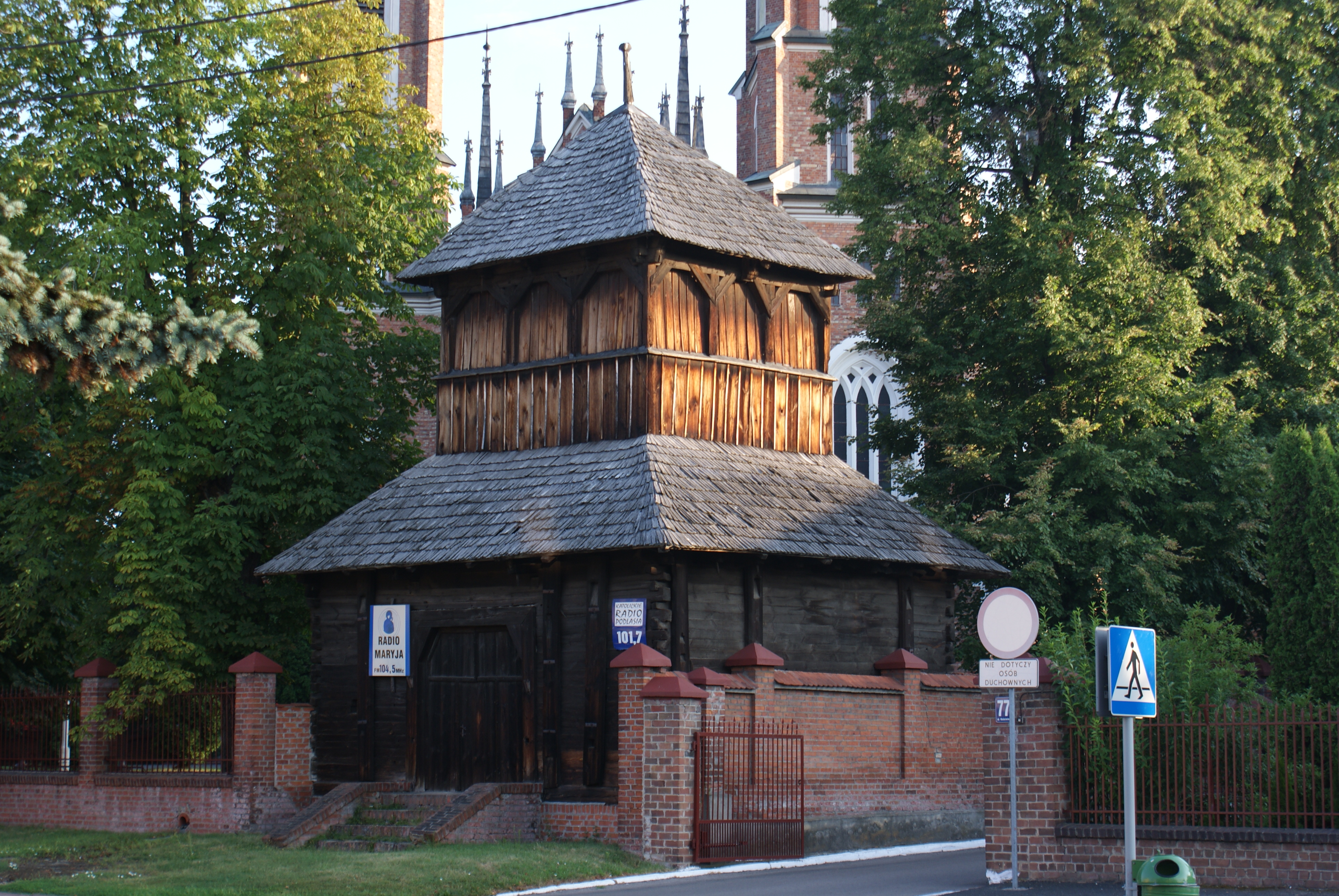
Wooden bell tower

Among points of interest there are:

- wooden bell tower (1675),
- former synagogue (19th century),
- Neo-Gothic Collegiate Basilica of Saint John the Baptist (1905–1913),
- Memorials to victims of World War II.

== Notable people ==
- Sławomir Nazaruk (born 1975), retired Polish footballer
