= Church of the Exaltation of the Holy Cross, Horostyta =

Orthodox church in Horostyta, Poland

Church of the Exaltation of the Holy Cross
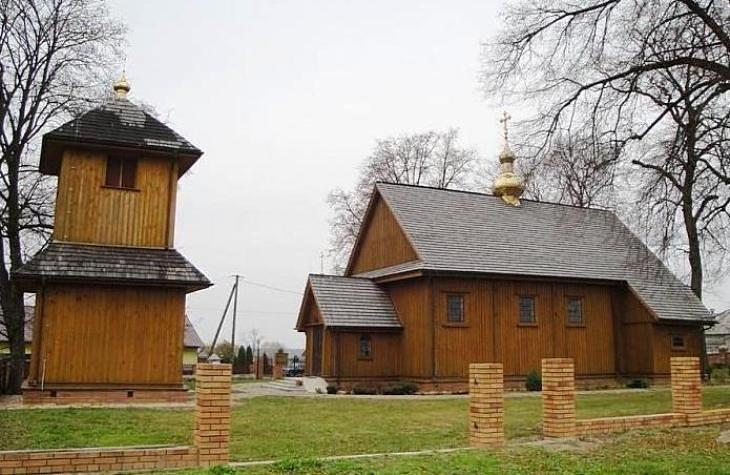
- General view of the church with a bell tower on the left
- Church of the Exaltation of the Holy Cross
- 51°35′23.6″N 23°14′16.3″E
- Location: Horostyta
- Country: Poland
- Denomination: Eastern Orthodoxy
- Previous denomination: Greek Catholic
- Churchmanship: Polish Orthodox Church

History
- Status: active Orthodox church
- Dedication: Exaltation of the Holy Cross
- Dedicated: September 26, 2021

Architecture
- Completed: 1702

Specifications
- Materials: wood

Administration
- Parish: Parish of the Exaltation of the Holy Cross in Horostyta

The Church of the Exaltation of the Holy Cross is a historic Orthodox church in Horostyta. It belongs to the parish of the same name, which is part of the Chełm Deanery within the Diocese of Lublin and Chełm of the Polish Orthodox Church.

The first church in Horostyta was built in 1521 as an Orthodox place of worship. In 1596, following the Union of Brest, it became part of the newly established Uniate Church along with the entire Chełm Eparchy. In 1702, the Kopeć family, owners of the Opole estate, funded a new wooden church in Horostyta. In 1875, as a result of the Conversion of Chełm Eparchy, the church was transferred to the Russian Orthodox Church. Between 1915 and 1923, it remained closed. During the Second Polish Republic, it served as the seat of an Orthodox parish. It was again closed in 1947 when Orthodox residents were deported as part of Operation Vistula. The parish was reestablished six years later.

The church is a single-nave, single-domed wooden structure. Inside, it houses an iconostasis from 1880 and older icons dating back to the late 18th and early 19th centuries. The building is located outside the village's dense development, near a road, and surrounded by historic trees. The church grounds are enclosed by an ornate fence.

== History ==
=== First church in Horostyta ===
The first mention of an Orthodox church in Horostyta dates back to 1521. It was founded by Jan Sopoćko, an Orthodox dean of Włodawa, with Michał Kopeć listed as one of its benefactors. The church functioned as a filial temple of the parish in Opole. In 1596, the church accepted the Union of Brest, as Orthodox Bishop Dionysius of Chełm endorsed its provisions, thereby bringing his entire diocese into the Uniate Church.

By 1699, the church in Horostyta had become the seat of a Uniate parish. Three years later, the Kopeć family, still the owners of the Opole estate, funded a new wooden church in the village. According to an 18th-century description, the building was topped with three crosses: one above the altar section, one over the vestibule, and one at the central point of the nave's roof. Between 1793 and 1794, the structure underwent a major renovation. In 1861, a bell tower was added, and another general renovation took place the same year. Funding for this work came from Stanisław Szlubowski, who allocated profits from a sugar factory he had established in 1843. In the years leading up to the Conversion of Chełm Eparchy, the church porch was expanded.

=== 1875–1947 ===
In 1875, the parish in Horostyta was incorporated into the Russian Orthodox Church, along with all other Uniate parishes in the Chełm Land, due to the administrative transfer of the entire Chełm diocese to the Orthodox Eparchia warszawska . Following this transition, the church in Horostyta underwent another renovation and received a new iconostasis around 1880. During the 1890s, the parish received significant financial support from Mikołaj Iwanow, with additional donations from local parishioners. After these renovations, the church was dedicated once again.

The church in Horostyta remained operational until 1915, when the local Orthodox population fled as part of the mass exile. From 1915 to 1917, services were held only occasionally, conducted by Russian military chaplains or by a monk from the St. Onuphrius Monastery in Jabłeczna. These services were attended by the few remaining Orthodox villagers who had not been forcibly evacuated into Russia ahead of the frontlines.

In 1919, when the Ministry of Religious Affairs and Public Education was drafting a network of Orthodox parishes in the Lublin Land, it did not initially plan to reopen the church in Horostyta. Both Orthodox and Catholic communities sought permission to use the building, with Catholics referencing its Uniate origins. Ultimately, the church was reopened as an Orthodox parish in 1923. It was assigned to the Włodawa Deanery of the Diocese of Warsaw and Chełm and was one of eight active Orthodox churches in Włodawa County.

During the interwar period, approximately 150 people – half of the village's Orthodox population – attended services regularly. Throughout World War II, the church remained in operation. According to 1943 records, it was the seat of one of 13 parishes in the Lublin Deanery of the Diocese of Chełm and Podlachia.

=== After 1947 ===
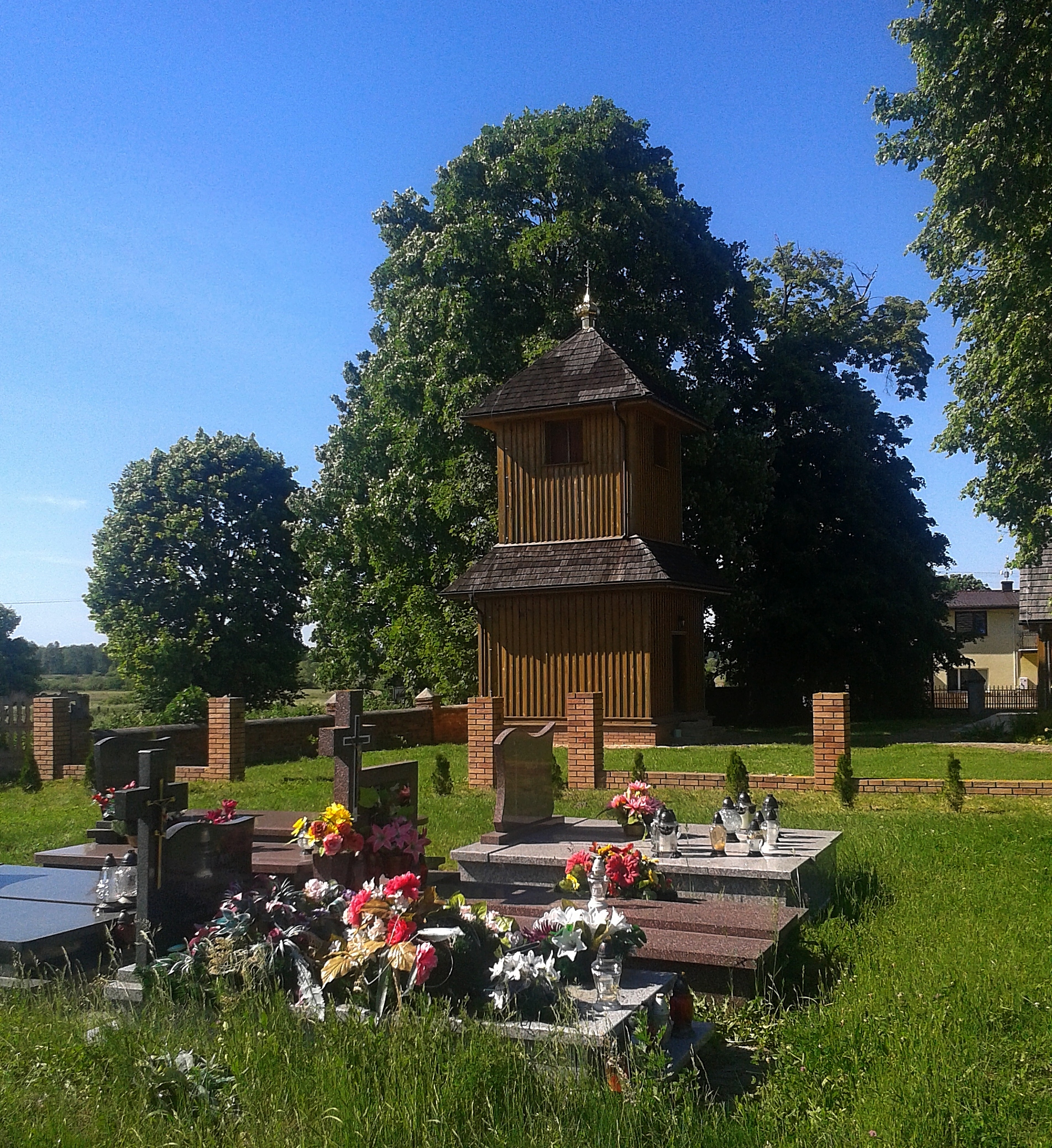
Church bell tower, view from the parish cemetery (from the north)

The church in Horostyta was closed in 1947 due to a lack of parishioners, as they were deported as part of Operation Vistula. The Włodawa County Office issued a ban on establishing an Orthodox parish in Horostyta in the same year, which was upheld by the Ministry of Religious Affairs and Public Education. Local authorities had a negative attitude toward Orthodoxy and attempted to hinder the activities of clergy from this faith, exaggerating the threat posed by Ukrainian nationalists related to opening Orthodox parishes. In such circumstances, the Włodawa County Office prevented the priest designated by the appropriate authorities of the Polish Orthodox Church from conducting pastoral work in Horostyta as early as 1946, as well as in the case of the churches in Holeszów and Uhrusk. In 1953, Metropolitan Macarius of Warsaw and all Poland began efforts to reopen the church (along with the filial Church of Saints Anthony of Kiev and Martyr Paraskeva in Hola). Although Roman Catholic clergy protested the reopening of the Horostyta parish (mainly attempting to block the reopening of the church in Hola), the parish resumed its activities in July of that year. By 1956, the church in Horostyta was one of four active churches in the Włodawa County, which was home to about 5,000 Orthodox believers.

In the 1960s and 1970s, the parish had 360 parishioners attending two churches – in Horostyta and Hola. This number gradually declined to a few dozen over the following decades. In 1984, the church in Horostyta was renovated once again. Between 2004 and 2010, the church underwent a major renovation co-financed by the Ministry of Culture and National Heritage and the European Union. During this period, the walls and foundations were restored, the roof covered with shingles was replaced, and the iconostasis was restored. The free-standing bell tower was also renovated. In 2021, the Provincial Conservator of Monuments in Lublin awarded the church the Conservation Laurel.

In 2021, in connection with the 500th anniversary of the construction of the first Horostyta church, a commemorative boulder with a cross was placed near the bell tower. During the ceremony (on September 26), Archbishop Abel of Lublin and Chełm dedicated the renovated church.

== Architecture ==
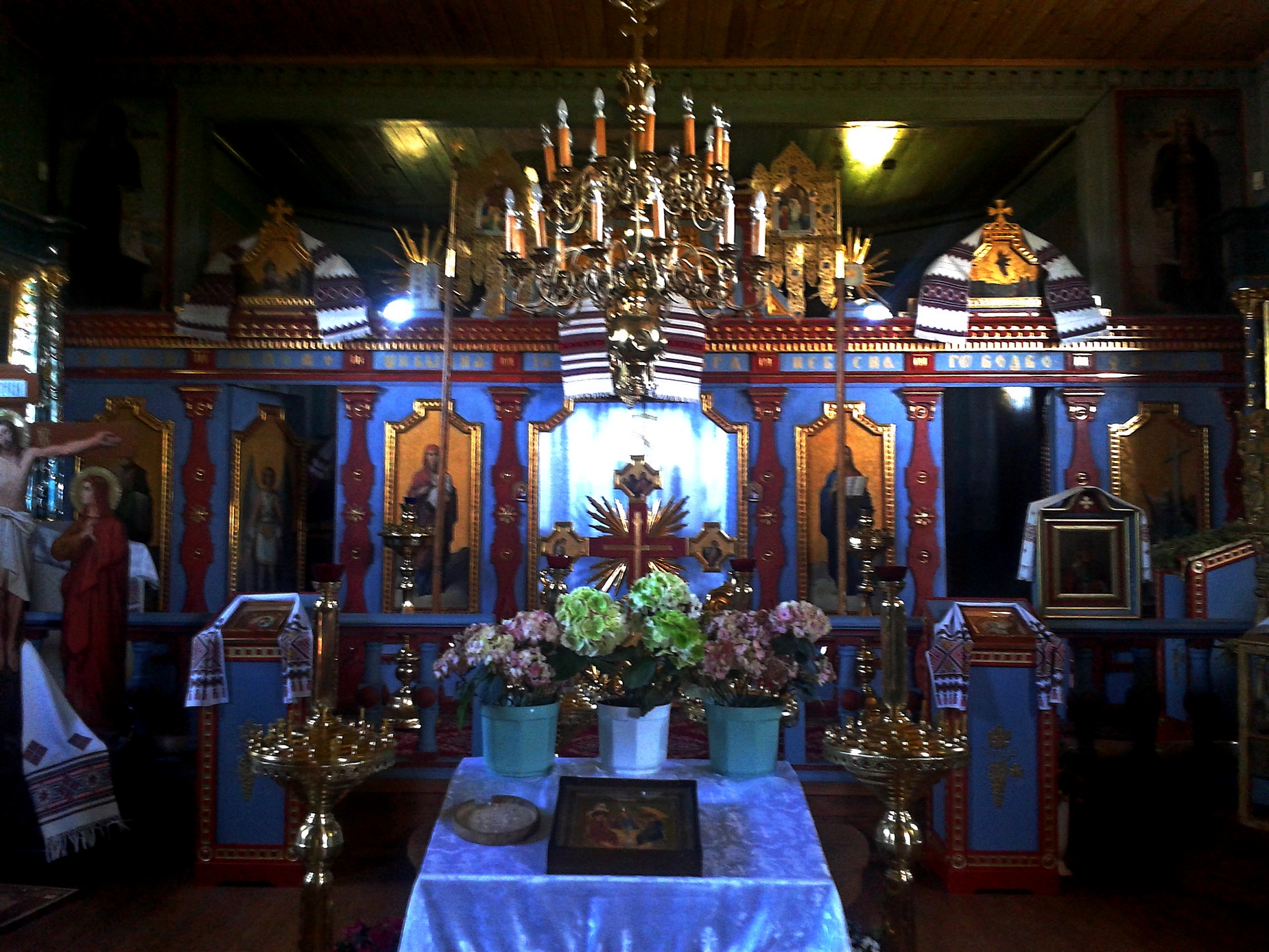
Iconostasis

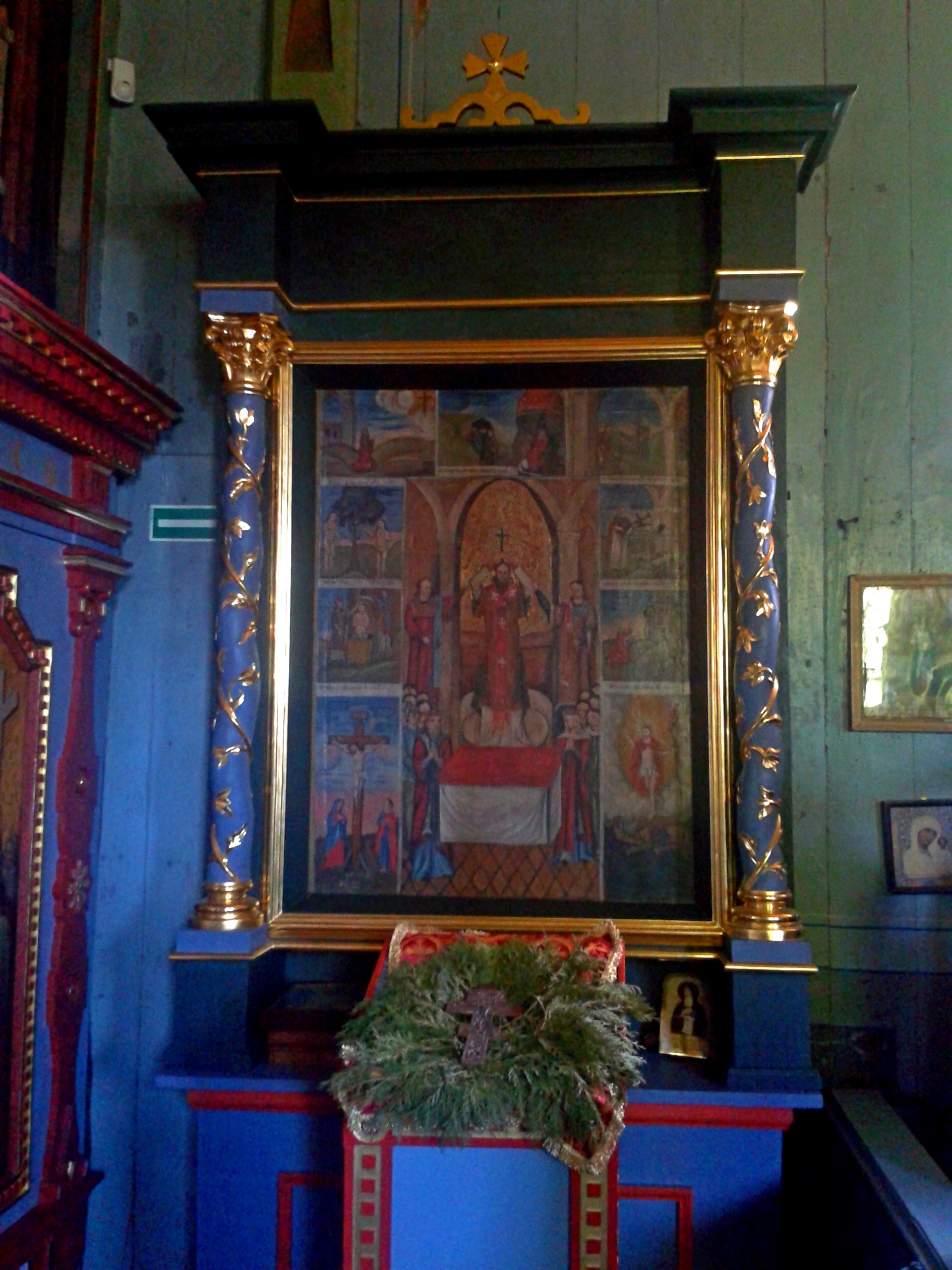
Late Gothic icon of the Elevation of the Holy Cross in the niche to the right of the iconostasis

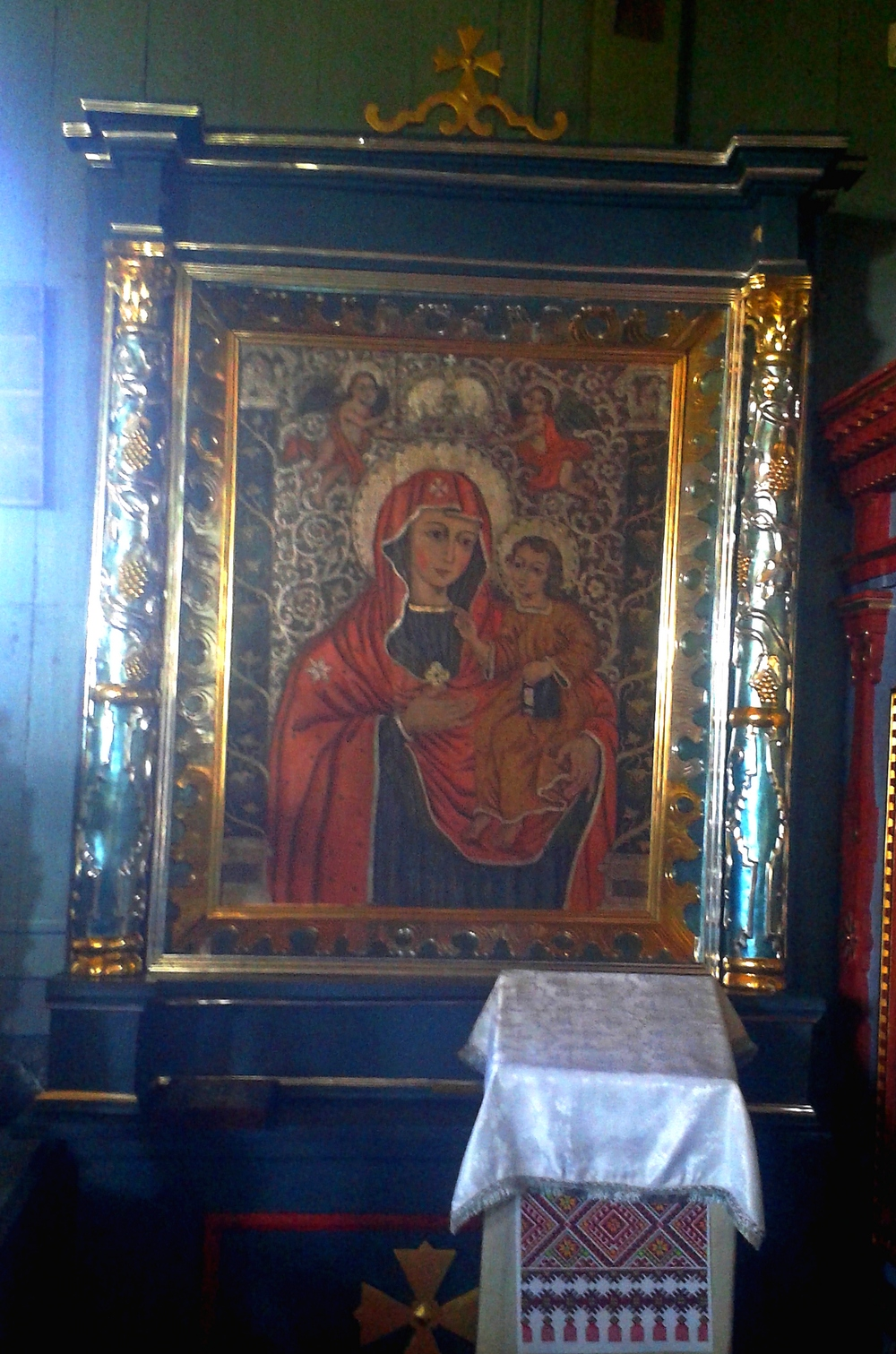
Icon of the Mother of God in the niche to the left of the iconostasis

The church in Horostyta is wooden, single-nave, with one dome, and a gable roof covered with shingles. The building is double-sided, and up to 100 believers can participate in the service at the same time.

The inventory of the church's furnishings from 1788 does not mention the iconostasis, only noting the royal doors and one image placed to their right, related to the dedication of the church. It is also known that at the beginning of the 19th century, the church had organs. The current iconostasis dates back to 1880. It is a wooden, polychromed structure with bronze-decorated elements. The iconostasis is single-tiered and painted white with brown pilasters. The icons on the iconostasis depict, from left to right: Saint Nicholas, Saint George, an Angel, the Mother of God, Christ Pantocrator, and the Elevation of the Holy Cross. The iconostasis also has a top section with three festive icons: the Nativity of Christ, the Ascension, and the Last Supper (Communion of the Apostles). The carved royal doors are decorated with acanthus leaf motifs, interwoven with small representations of the four Evangelists, the Archangel Gabriel announcing to Mary the conception and birth of Christ, and the Mother of God herself.

Among the side icons in the church in Horostyta is a late Gothic icon of the Elevation of the Holy Cross, painted in oil on wood. The scene, which is the main theme of the icon, is surrounded by a series of smaller images. These include: the Crucifixion, the Baptism of Saint Paul, the Original Sin, Saint Paul's Prayer, the Resurrection, the Finding of the Holy Cross, the search for the Cross by Empress Helena, the Burial, the Dormition of the Mother of God, the Mother of God surrounded by saints (the Prophet Elijah, Abraham, Stephen, Paraskeva, Catherine, and Irene), Christ's Prayer in the Garden of Gethsemane, Saints Theodosius and Anthony of the Caves, Saint Boris, and the Resurrection surrounded by twelve more saints. Another valuable item in the church's furnishings is the early 19th-century icon of the Mother of God with the Child, located in the niche to the left of the iconostasis. The church also contains festal icons with the following depictions: the Chelm Icon of the Mother of God with Saint Catherine, Saint Demetrius of Thessalonica with the Risen Christ, the Leszno Icon of the Mother of God and the Ascension, the Mount Athos Icon of the Mother of God, the Icon of the Mother of God "Znak" (Sign), and Saint Helena in the icon of the Elevation of the Holy Cross.

The church and its bell tower were entered into the registry of historical monuments on 27 January 1967 under number A/143.

== Bibliography ==
- Urban, K. (1996). Kościół prawosławny w Polsce 1945–1970 [The Orthodox Church in Poland 1945–1970] (in Polish). Kraków: Nomos. ISBN 83-85527-35-4.
