= Church of Saints Anthony of Kiev and Martyr Paraskeva =

Orthodox church in Hola, Poland

- Cerkiew św. Antoniego Pieczerskiego i św. Męczennicy Paraskiewy
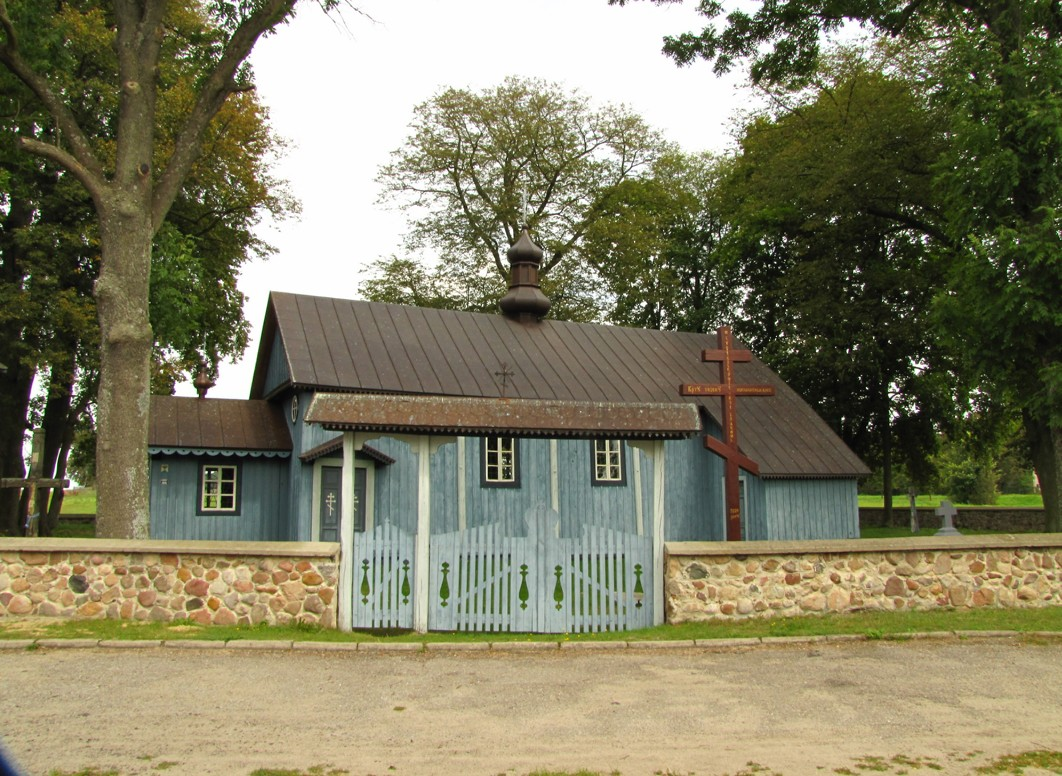
- General view
- Church of Saints Anthony of Kiev and Martyr Paraskeva
- 51°32′56.0″N 23°10′38.8″E
- Location: Hola
- Country: Poland
- Denomination: Eastern Orthodoxy
- Previous denomination: Uniate (until 1875); Eastern Orthodoxy (1875–1915); Neouniate (1924–1939)
- Churchmanship: Polish Orthodox Church

History
- Status: active Orthodox church
- Dedication: Anthony of Kiev, Martyr Paraskeva
- Dedicated: November 10, 2014

Architecture
- Completed: 1702

Specifications
- Materials: wood

Administration
- Diocese: Diocese of Lublin and Chełm

The Church of Saints Anthony of Kiev and Martyr Paraskeva is an Orthodox filial church in Hola. It belongs to the Parish of the Exaltation of the Holy Cross in Horostyta, in the Chełm Eparchy of the Diocese of Lublin and Chełm of the Polish Orthodox Church. It is located near the Museum of Material Culture of the Chełm and Podlachia in Hola. Near the church, there is an Orthodox cemetery with the Chapel of the Protection of the Mother of God.

The Orthodox parish in Hola was mentioned in 1588. In the early years after the Union of Brest, it accepted its provisions. Therefore, the new church erected in 1610 was a Uniate temple. This building survived until 1700, when it was destroyed in a fire. Two years later, another church was built on its site, which existed until 1846, when it was once again replaced by a new temple. The last major reconstruction of the building took place after 1875 when the Hola parish, due to the abolition of the Uniate Chełm Eparchy, moved to the Russian Orthodox Church. Hola was one of the localities where illegal Uniate communities survived despite repressions.

In 1915, the Orthodox population of Hola was evacuated to Russia. After their return, the church was not reopened as Orthodox but functioned as Neouniate from 1924 to 1939. The church returned to the Orthodox faith during World War II but was closed again in 1947 and for the next six years was opened only during Easter holidays. It was restored for liturgical use in 1953.

== History ==
=== First churches in Hola ===
The Orthodox parish in Hola was established by 1588 at the latest. It likely accepted the Union of Brest immediately after its signing, (Note: The Orthodox Bishop of Chełm, Dionysius, accepted the Union, which involved the transition of the entire administration to the newly formed Uniate Church.) as the new church in Hola, funded by Florian Rzewuski in 1610, was already a Uniate temple. This building was completely destroyed in a fire during the Swedish invasion. According to another source, the destruction of the church by fire occurred in 1700. A new church was erected on the site of the 17th-century temple in 1702. The building was renovated in the mid-18th century, with further renovation work taking place between 1800 and 1803. In 1814, a bell tower was built next to the church, and an iconostasis was installed inside the church.

=== 1846 church ===
Another church in Hola, also Uniate, was built between 1846 and 1847 according to a design by a district architect. The church porch of the older building was preserved in the construction of the new temple. In 1875, due to the abolition of the Uniate Chełm Eparchy, the Hola parish was forcibly converted to Orthodoxy and incorporated into the structures of the Chełm vicariate of the Diocese of Warsaw and Chełm. Following this event, the building was reconstructed, and a new church porch was added. Not all Uniate faithful in Hola accepted Orthodoxy – this locality, along with Kostomłoty, Kodeń, southern Zamość region, and Tomaszów region, is noted as one of the few places in the former Russian partition where individuals identifying with Byzantine-rite Catholicism still lived after Poland regained independence.

==== Neouniate church ====
After Poland regained independence in 1918, the church in Hola was not returned to the Orthodox population returning from mass migration. Instead, on 10 August 1924, it was restored for liturgical use as the first Neouniate parish in the Lublin Land, established by Bishop Henryk Przeździecki of Siedlce. The church was given a new dedication to St. Paraskeva. While only 15 faithful attended the parish at its establishment, by the turn of 1929 and 1930 the Hola church was the seat of the region's largest Neouniate parish, comprising 1,879 people, more than half of all Neouniates. During its time in the Neouniate Church, the church was served alternately by a clergyman who converted from Orthodoxy and priests belonging to the Jesuit order. The ritual typical of the Russian Orthodox Church was fully preserved, with the addition of only prayers for the pope. The church in Hola remained Neouniate until 1939.

=== World War II and post-war period ===
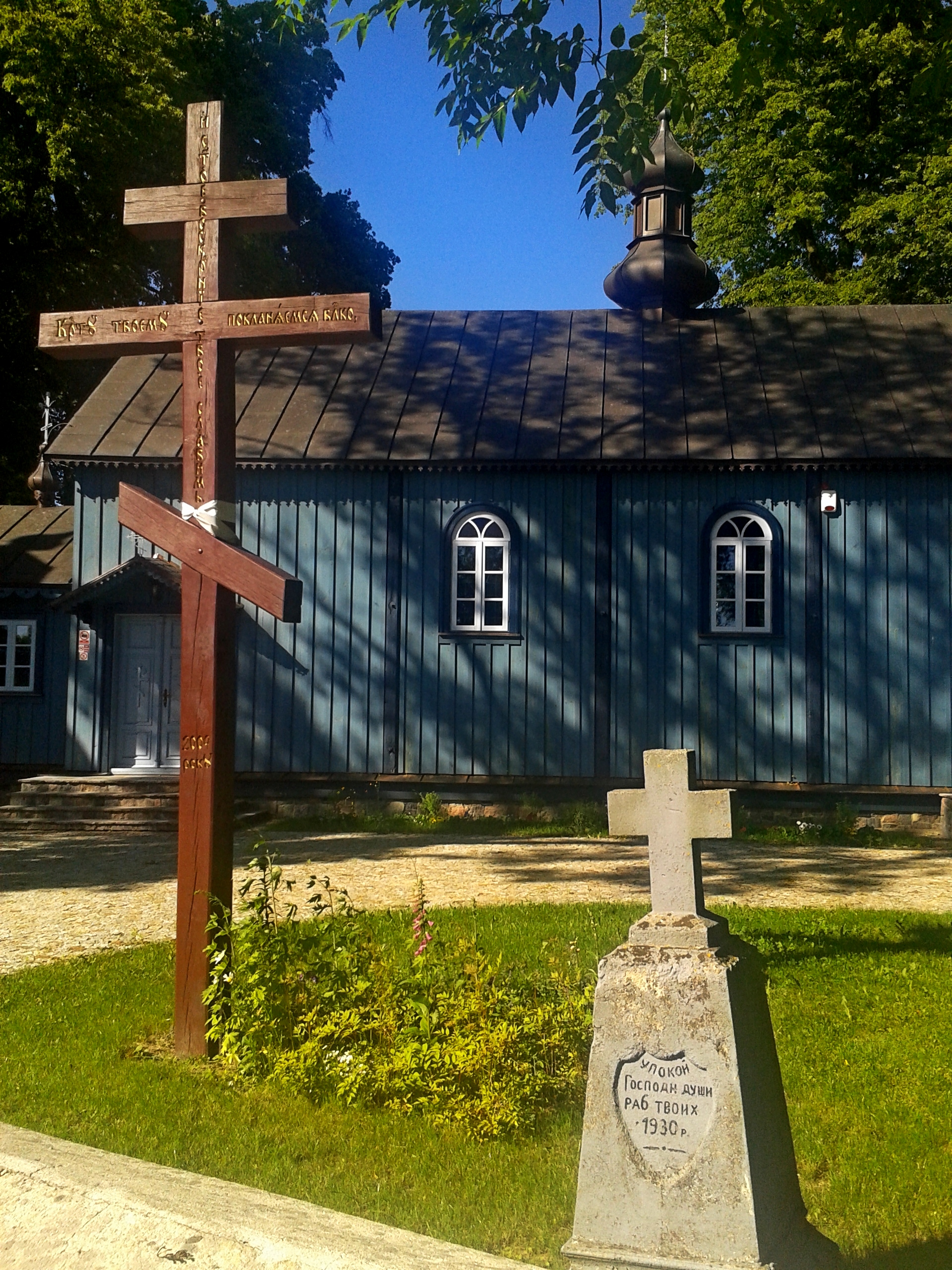
Crosses near the church

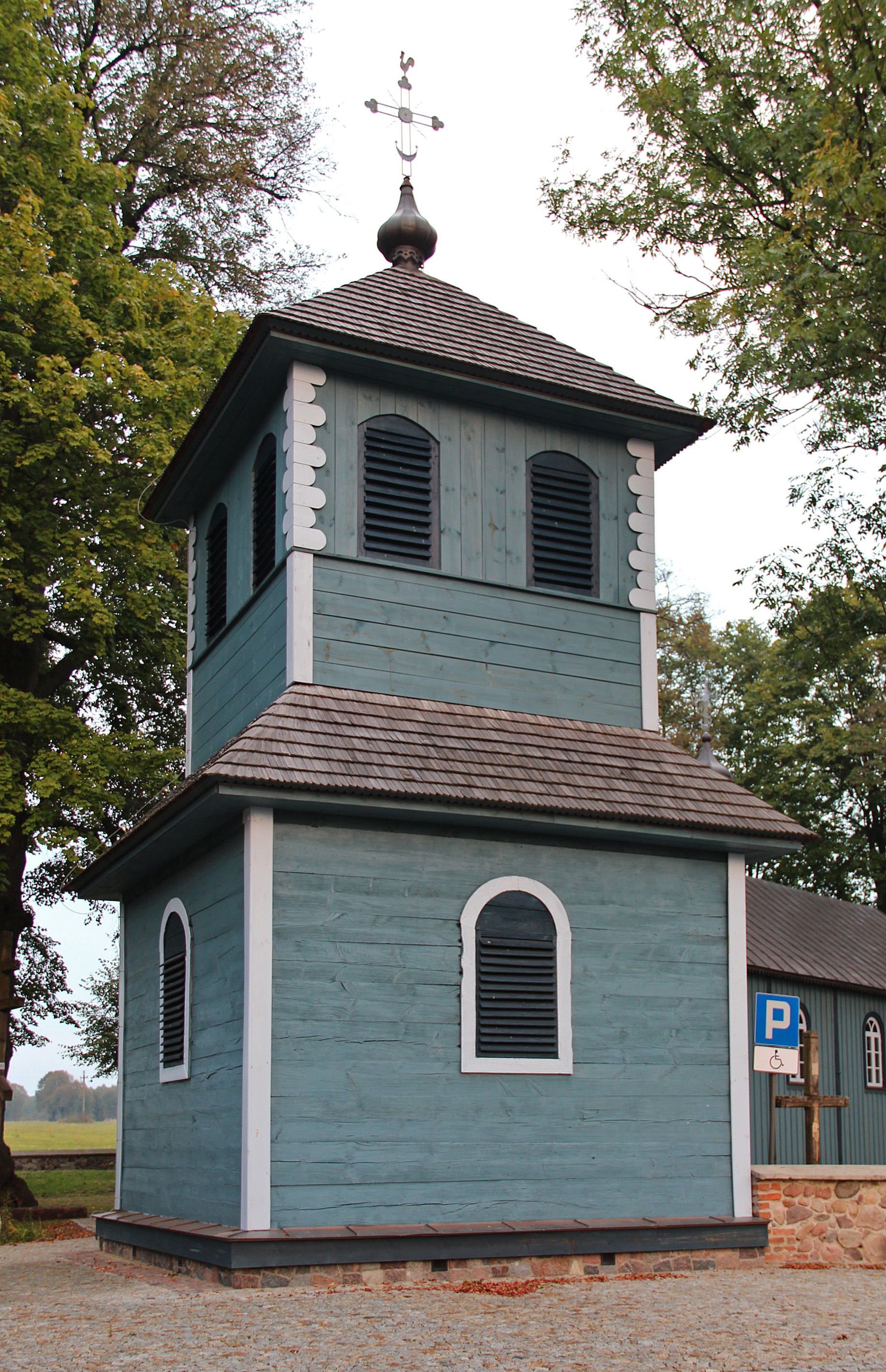
Bell tower

In 1941, the church suffered damage from a fire; it was restored by local faithful between 1943 and 1944. During the roof reconstruction, the original form was not preserved. Hola once again became the seat of an Orthodox parish. In 1947, the churches in Hola and Sosnowica had a combined attendance of 1,422 faithful. The pastoral activities ceased following the deportations of Orthodox Ukrainians during Operation Vistula and subsequent deportations to the Soviet Union. For three consecutive years, the church was opened only during Easter holidays. In 1953, Metropolitan Macarius Oksiyuk of Warsaw and all Poland requested permission from the Office for Religious Affairs to reestablish the parish in Horostyta, with the concurrent opening of the church in Hola as a filial church. His request was approved on March 31 of that year. The approval was preceded by a dispute between the Presidium of the County National Council in Włodawa and the Presidium of the Provincial National Council in Lublin. The Presidium of the County National Council claimed that the churches in Horostyta and Hola were essentially Catholic churches used by Catholics before World War II and had only passed into Orthodox hands due to support from the German occupation administration. The provincial authorities considered this stance to be a result of Catholic clergy agitation. Consequently, it was deemed appropriate to remove the chairman of the Gromada National Council in Wołoskowola (particularly opposed to the opening of Orthodox churches) and to restore the churches for liturgical use. In 1962, unknown perpetrators destroyed the historic church wall. In 1969, the total number of faithful in the Horostyta parish, including the Hola filial, was estimated at 700 people.

Between 2010 and 2014, the church underwent extensive renovations – foundations were replaced and raised, new cladding, flooring, window and door carpentry, roof framework and covering were installed, and electrical, fire protection, and alarm systems were replaced, with the interior walls fully renovated. After the renovations, the church was solemnly dedicated by Archbishop Abel of Lublin and Chełm.

The church is a filial of the parish of the Exaltation of the Holy Cross in Horostyta; services are held there twice a month. The building is open to visitors. Every year at the end of July, the Divine Liturgy in the church marks the beginning of the Holeński Fair – a folklore and ethnographic event combined with a folk artist market. The parish feast on July 24 is a significant religious holiday for Orthodox residents of the Lublin, Biała, Włodawa, and Chełm counties.

== Architecture ==
=== Building structure ===
The church in Hola is a wooden temple with a log structure, covered with formwork, built on foundations, and reinforced with braces. The entire building is constructed on a rectangular plan. To the north of the building is the sacristy, to the south is the treasury, and to the west is the church porch. Originally, the church was tripartite, but several reconstructions have changed its interior to a hall-like structure. Inside, above the entrance, there is a matroneum. The windows in the side and rear walls of the church are semicircular, while those in the remaining walls are rectangular. Originally, the temple was topped with three small domes, of which one has survived.

=== Interior ===
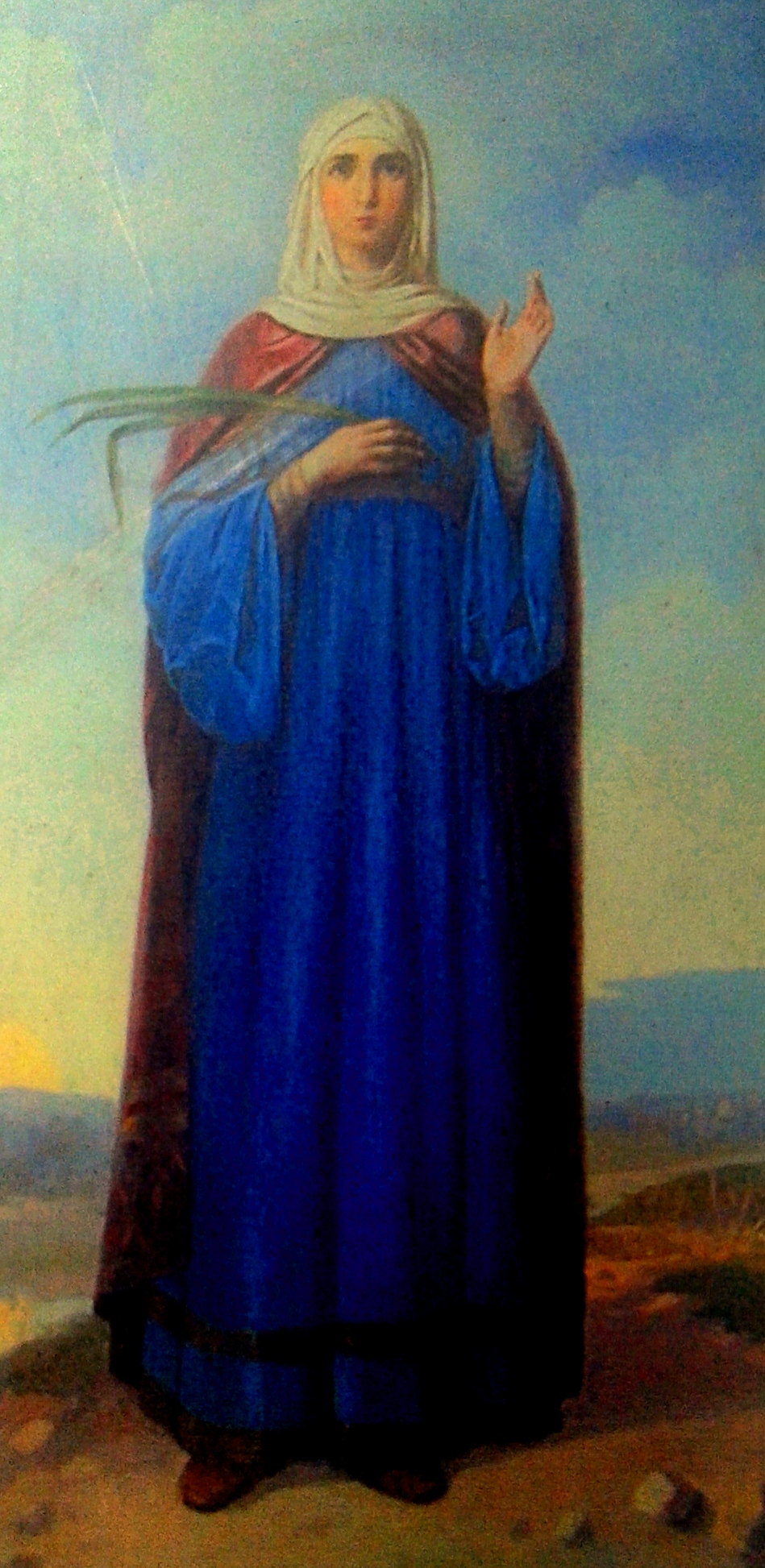
Painting of St. Paraskeva, the patroness of the church

The church houses a historic iconostasis from the second half of the 19th century. It includes images of the Mother of God with Child, Christ Pantocrator, Archangels Gabriel and Michael, and the church's patron. Older than the iconostasis is a feretery from 1762, funded by Korneliusz Szczupak, depicting the patron of the founder and the Mother of God in the Eleusa type. The church also features an icon of Uniate origin: an image of the Immaculate Conception surrounded by 12 other depictions of Mary and figures of the four evangelists from the late 18th or early 19th century, a copy of the image of Black Madonna of Częstochowa from the 18th century, as well as Uniate paintings that do not have iconographic characteristics: St. Paraskeva (from 1774), Ecce homo (18th–19th century). A much older item is a 15th-century icon of Mary, described in the 1975 monument catalog as severely damaged.

Other historic elements include a Baroque monstrance from the 18th century, a neoclassical chalice from the first half of the 19th century, and historic Uniate liturgical books from 1639 and 1780.

The church, bell tower, and Orthodox cemetery in Hola were listed in the register of monuments on 19 May 1966 (again on 27 December 1995) under number A/44.

== Bibliography ==
- Pelica, Grzegorz (2007). Kościół prawosławny w województwie lubelskim (1918–1939) (in Polish). Lublin: Fundacja Dialog Narodów. ISBN 978-83-925882-0-7.
- Wysocki, J. (2011). Ukraińcy na Lubelszczyźnie w latach 1944–1956 (in Polish). Lublin: Instytut Pamięci Narodowej. ISBN 978-83-7629-260-1.
