= Church of the Dormition of the Mother of God, Uhrusk =

Orthodox church in Uhrusk, Poland

Church of the Dormition of the Mother of God
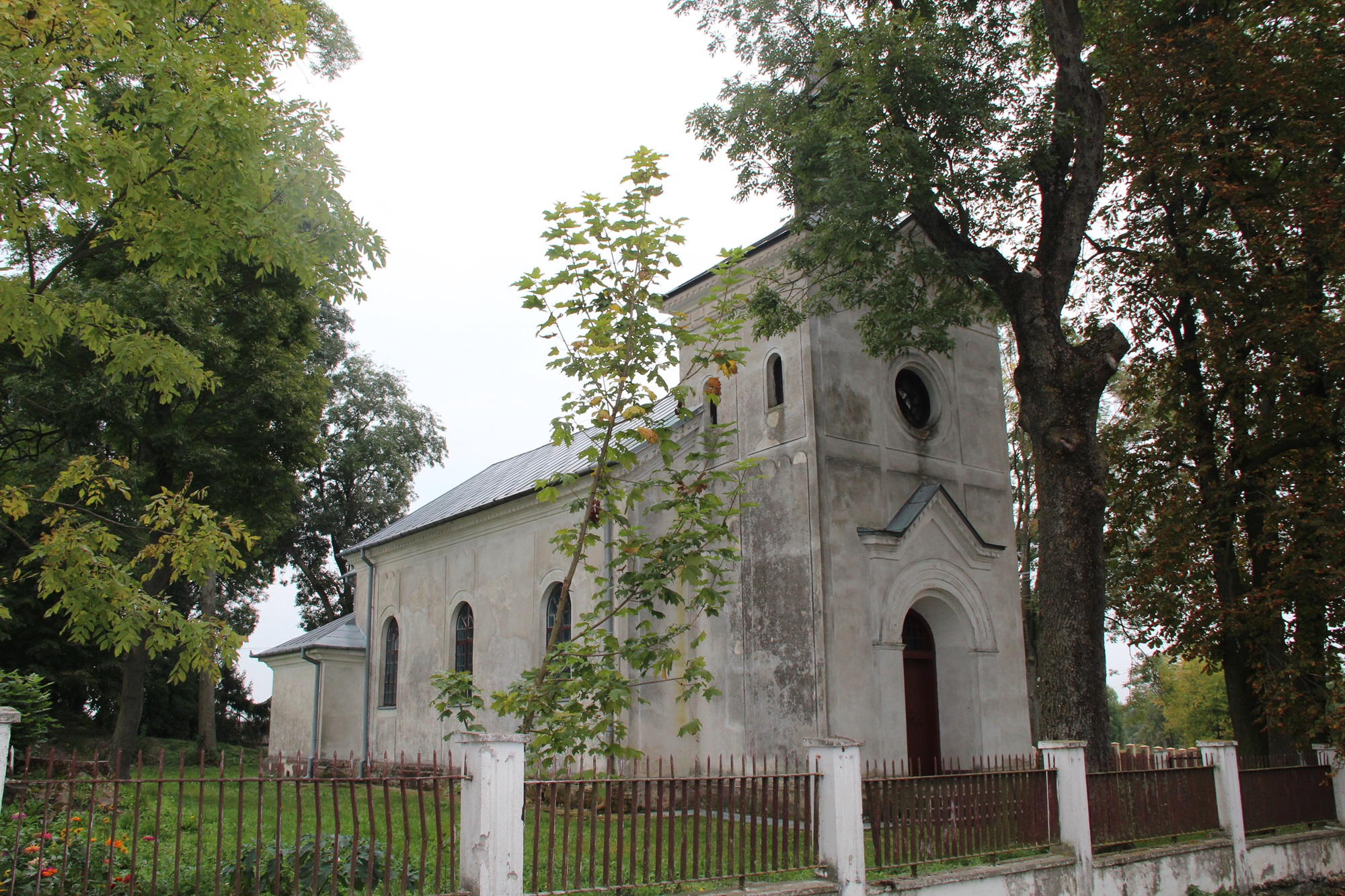
- General view of the church
- Church of the Dormition of the Mother of God
- 51°17′52.8″N 23°37′50.7″E
- Location: Uhrusk
- Country: Poland
- Denomination: Eastern Orthodoxy
- Previous denomination: Greek-Catholic
- Churchmanship: Polish Orthodox Church

History
- Status: active Orthodox church
- Dedication: Dormition of the Mother of God

Architecture
- Style: Classical, Russian Revival
- Completed: 1849

Specifications
- Materials: brick

Administration
- Diocese: Diocese of Lublin and Chełm

Church of the Dormition of the Mother of God is an Orthodox church and a filial church in Uhrusk. It belongs to the Parish of the Nativity of Mary in Włodawa, within the Chełm Deanery of the Diocese of Lublin and Chełm of the Polish Orthodox Church. The church is situated on the outskirts of the village, on a low, flat elevation where, in the Middle Ages, a fortified settlement was established by Daniel of Galicia.

An Orthodox church of the Dormition of the Mother of God existed in Uhrusk before 1220 and initially held the status of a cathedral. It lost this status when Uhrusk ceased to be the seat of the Chełm eparchy. Until around 1267–1268, it functioned as a monastic church. Subsequent churches were built on the same site before 1429 and in 1785. From the 17th century, the church in Uhrusk belonged to the Uniate Church. The current structure (21st century) was constructed in 1849 and, in 1875, together with the entire Chełm Eparchy, it transferred to the Russian Orthodox Church. During its adaptation and reconstruction, an iconostasis was installed, created by combining two former Uniate side altars, and a vestibule with a bell tower was likely added. In 1915, the church was abandoned as the Orthodox residents of Uhrusk fled during the mass exile. From 1920 to 1927, it underwent repairs due to significant damage sustained during World War I and the Polish–Soviet War. The church was active again from 1920 until 1947, when it closed following the deportation of Orthodox Ukrainians during Operation Vistula. It was reopened for liturgical use in 1957 or 1958 as a filial church of the parish in Włodawa, with some of its furnishings, damaged in the previous decade, replaced with items from the Church of St. George in Zbereże, destroyed in 1938.

== History ==
=== Early churches of the Dormition of the Mother of God in Uhrusk ===
The first Orthodox church in Uhrusk was erected no later than 1220. It served as a cathedral during the period when Uhrusk hosted an Orthodox Chełm eparchy. Around 1240, this eparchy was relocated to Chełm. Until 1267–1268, a monastery dedicated to St. Daniel operated alongside the church.

A subsequent Orthodox church was built in Uhrusk before 1429. It remained under the jurisdiction of the Orthodox Chełm Eparchy. It joined the Uniate Church following the Union of Brest in the 17th century. From 1661, it became the seat of a Uniate parish. A third church, also Uniate, was constructed in Uhrusk in 1785, funded by Barbara Noskowska, with additional contributions pledged in 1661 by Stanisława (or, according to another source, Barbara) Krasińska, the castellan's wife of Płock. This wooden structure served a parish of 580 faithful.

=== Brick church ===
The current (21st century) church building was erected in 1849 as a Greek Catholic temple, funded by Laura Kirsztejnowa, the owner of local estates. It was built adjacent to the older church, which was dismantled during the new construction due to its poor condition.

The building passed to the Russian Orthodox Church following the Conversion of Chełm Eparchy in 1875. To adapt the interior for Orthodox liturgy, two side altars from the church were combined to form an iconostasis. A bell tower was likely added at this time, no later than 1893. After a major renovation and renewal of this structure, the church was rededicated on 7 November 1907.

In 1915, the Orthodox residents of Uhrusk fled during the mass exile, abandoning the church, which was severely vandalized that same year. It suffered further damage from a fire in 1916 and was vandalized again in 1920 during the Polish–Soviet War. On 15 August 1920, the church was reactivated and once again became the seat of an Orthodox parish. It underwent repairs from 1920 to 1927.

On 25 July 1944, the church was damaged during wartime operations. After World War II and the resettlement of Ukrainians to the Soviet Union, only 252 Orthodox individuals remained in Uhrusk and Kosyń by 1947. That year, during Operation Vistula, nearly all Orthodox residents were deported from Uhrusk, and the parish suspended its activities. Some sources indicate the church reopened on 15 August 1957, while others suggest 1958. State authorities then permitted the opening of two new Orthodox churches in the Lublin Land – in Zamość and Uhrusk. Neither regained parish status, instead becoming filial churches; the Uhrusk church was subordinated to the parish in Włodawa. The authorities approved their operation after Polish Orthodox Church hierarchs argued that they would facilitate missionary work among Greek Catholics. During its closure, the Roman Catholic Church cared for the building. Upon reopening, much of its valuable furnishings were found stolen or destroyed. Consequently, items from the Church of St. George in Zbereże, demolished during the 1938 restitution campaign, were transferred to Uhrusk. Another source claims this occurred in 1960, with the entire iconostasis restored six years later in 1966. By 1969, the Włodawa parish had 300 members, though it's unclear how many regularly attended the filial church in Uhrusk.

The church was listed in the register of monuments on 2 June 1987 under number A/133/39. It underwent renovations after the establishment of the Diocese of Lublin and Chełm.

== Architecture ==
=== Building structure ===
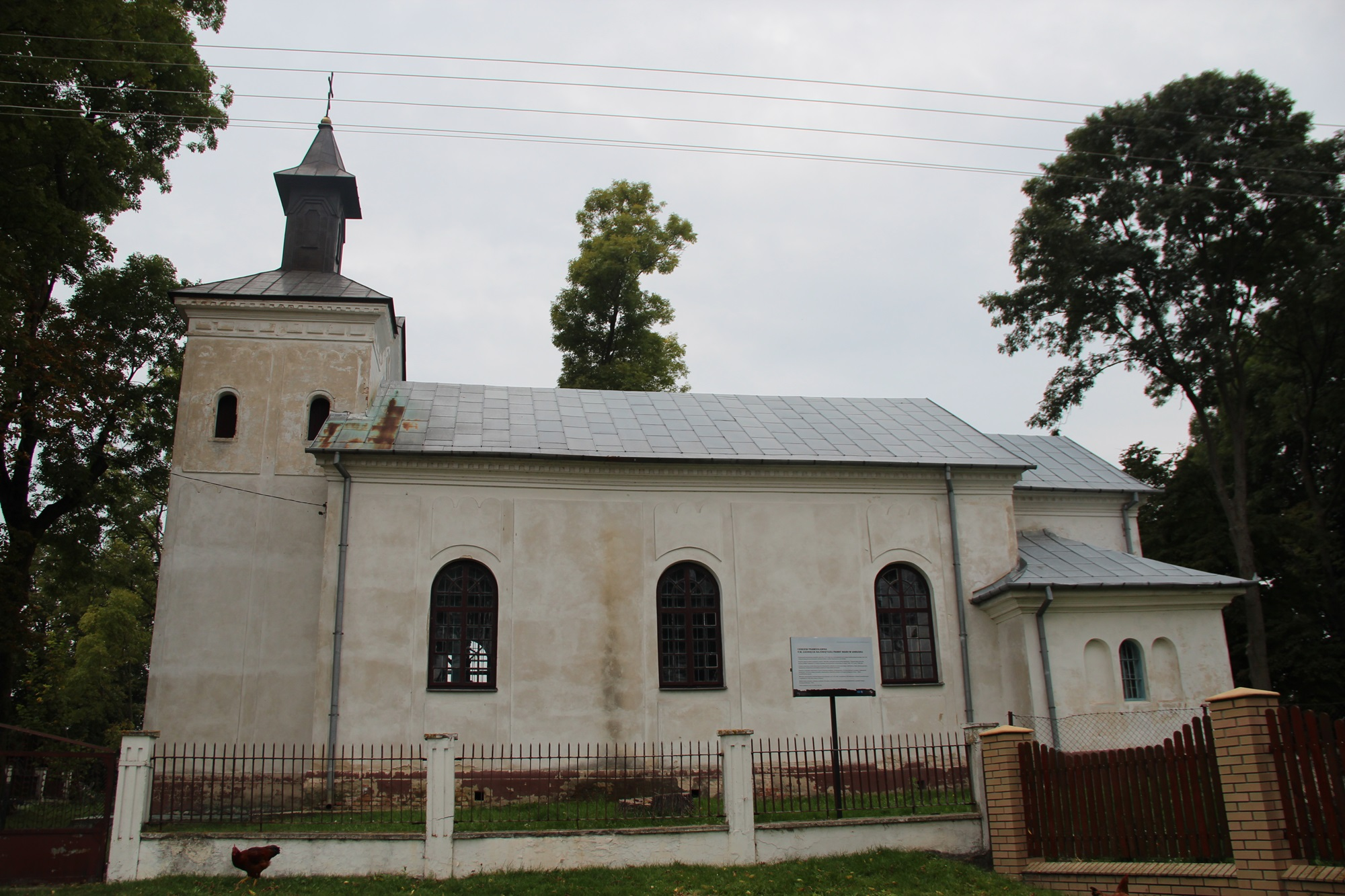
Side elevation

The church in Uhrusk was built on an elongated plan and became a tripartite structure after the addition of a tower. Its single nave, divided into three bays, is rectangular and covered with a gable roof. The three-part chancel (with two sacristies) has a straight closure and is also topped with a gable roof, while the sacristies have triangular roofs. The bell tower, constructed on a square plan, rises above the church porch and is crowned with a single ridge turret. The bell tower is covered with a multi-pitched roof clad in metal.

The building is oriented. Its style is described as Classical-Russian Revival with elements of Romanesque Revival and Gothic Revival architecture.

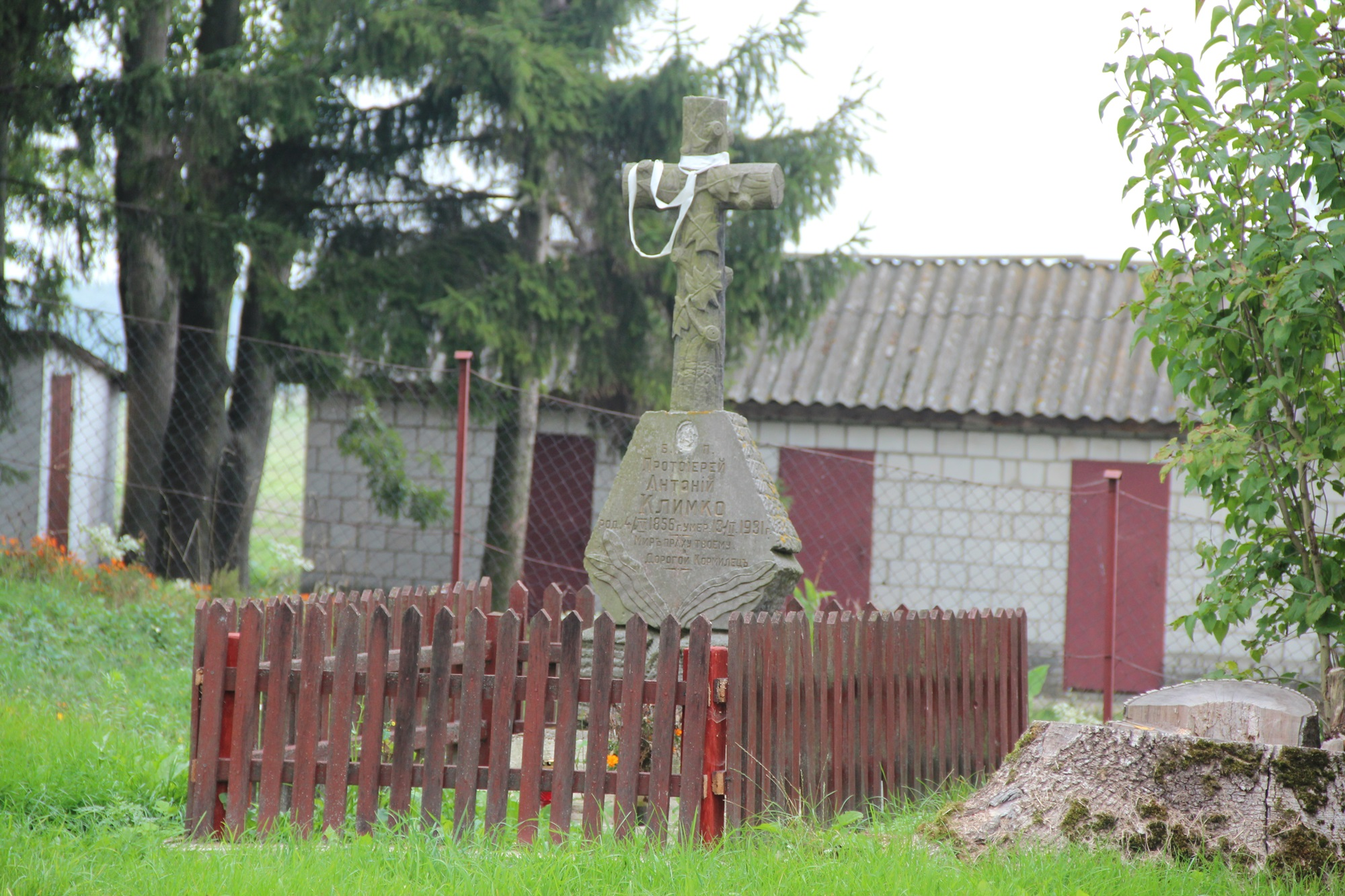
Grave of an Orthodox priest, Andrij Klimka, near the church

Compared to other Uniate churches built in the Lublin Land during the same period, the Uhrusk church stands out for its decorative architectural details. Its facades are divided by panels, with semicircular arches above the windows. The cornice under the eaves is enhanced with a dentil frieze. On the bell tower, this frieze transitions into triangular gable ends, a motif echoed in the modest Romanesque Revival portal at the entrance. This portal features two Tuscan pilasters and a semicircular archivolt. The windows are semicircular, except for a rectangular window in the chancel. Since the Uhrusk church never became a Roman Catholic church (unlike many other Eastern Christian sacred buildings in the region), its appearance offers insights into the original design of 19th-century Uniate churches in the Lublin Land and how they were adapted after transitioning to Orthodoxy.

=== Interior ===
The nave and chancel are covered with apparent wooden vaults with angular profiles. The chancel arch is semicircular, and the three bays of the nave are separated by semicircular brick arches.

The iconostasis in the Uhrusk church is single-tiered with a crowning section, likely from an older church in the same location, dating to the 18th century. This crowning contains icons of Saints John, Mark, and Matthew. The church also houses three historic Uniate icons: 18th-century depictions of the Mother of God and St. Nicholas (a folk painting with Baroque features) and a 17th-century icon of the Mother of God. Additionally, there is a processional banner featuring Michael the Archangel and the Mother of God (modeled on the Chełm Icon of the Mother of God). The church contains a pax made of brass, depicting the crucified Jesus against a backdrop of Jerusalem with God the Father at the top. The reverse once bore a date and an inscription, now illegible.

== Bibliography ==
- Wysocki, J. (2011). Ukraińcy na Lubelszczyźnie w latach 1944–1956 [Ukrainians in the Lublin Land in the Years 1944–1956] (in Polish). Lublin: Instytut Pamięci Narodowej. ISBN 978-83-7629-260-1.
