= Horostyta =

- Village
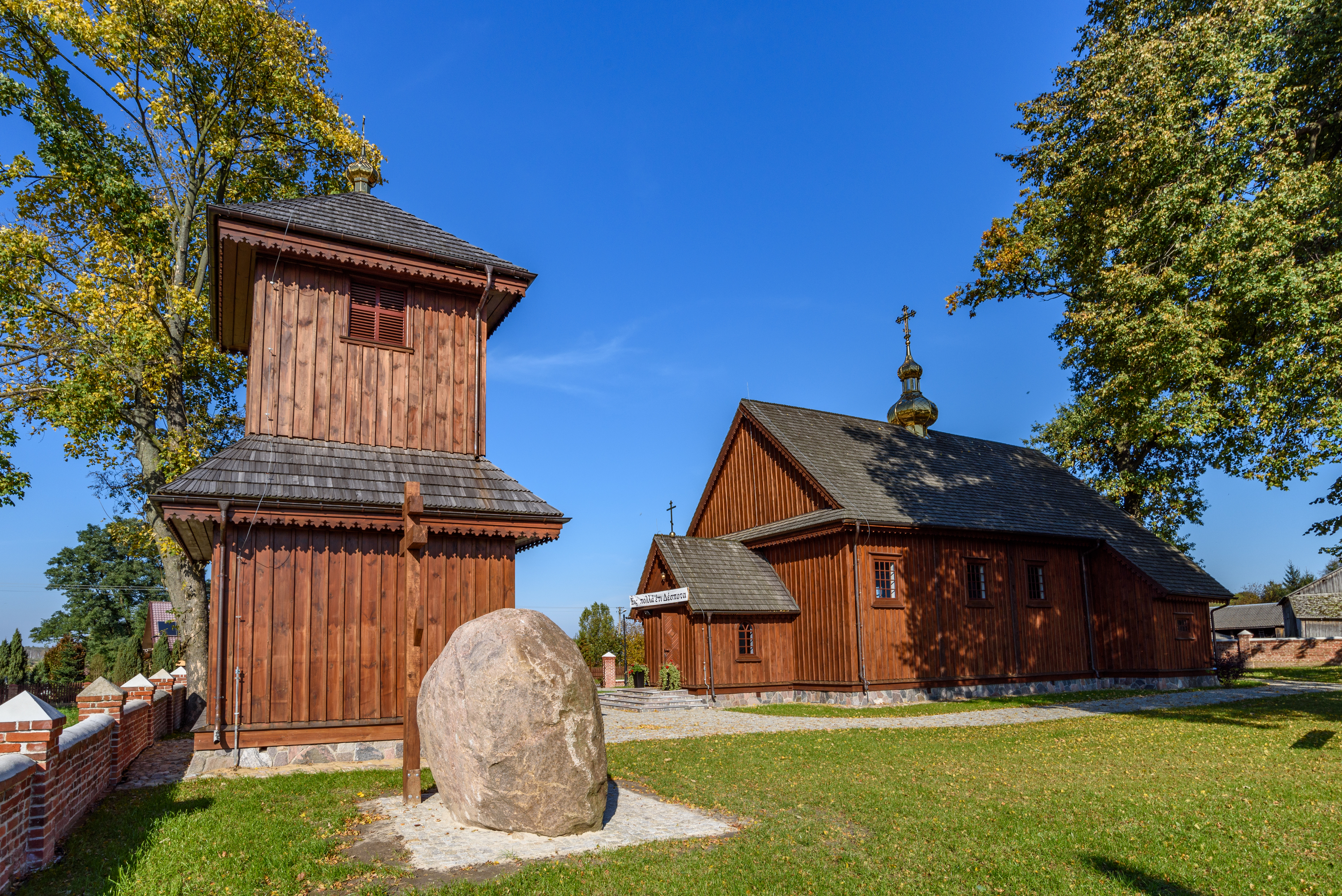
- Church of the Exaltation of the Holy Cross, Horostyta

- Location within Poland
- Coordinates: 51°36′N 23°15′E
- Country: Poland
- Voivodeship: Lublin
- County: Włodawa
- Gmina: Wyryki
- Time zone: UTC+1 (CET)
  - Summer (DST): UTC+2 (CEST)
- Vehicle registration: LWL

Horostyta [xɔrɔsˈtɨta] is a village in the administrative district of Gmina Wyryki, within Włodawa County, Lublin Voivodeship, in eastern Poland.
