= Hola, Włodawa County =

Hola
- Village
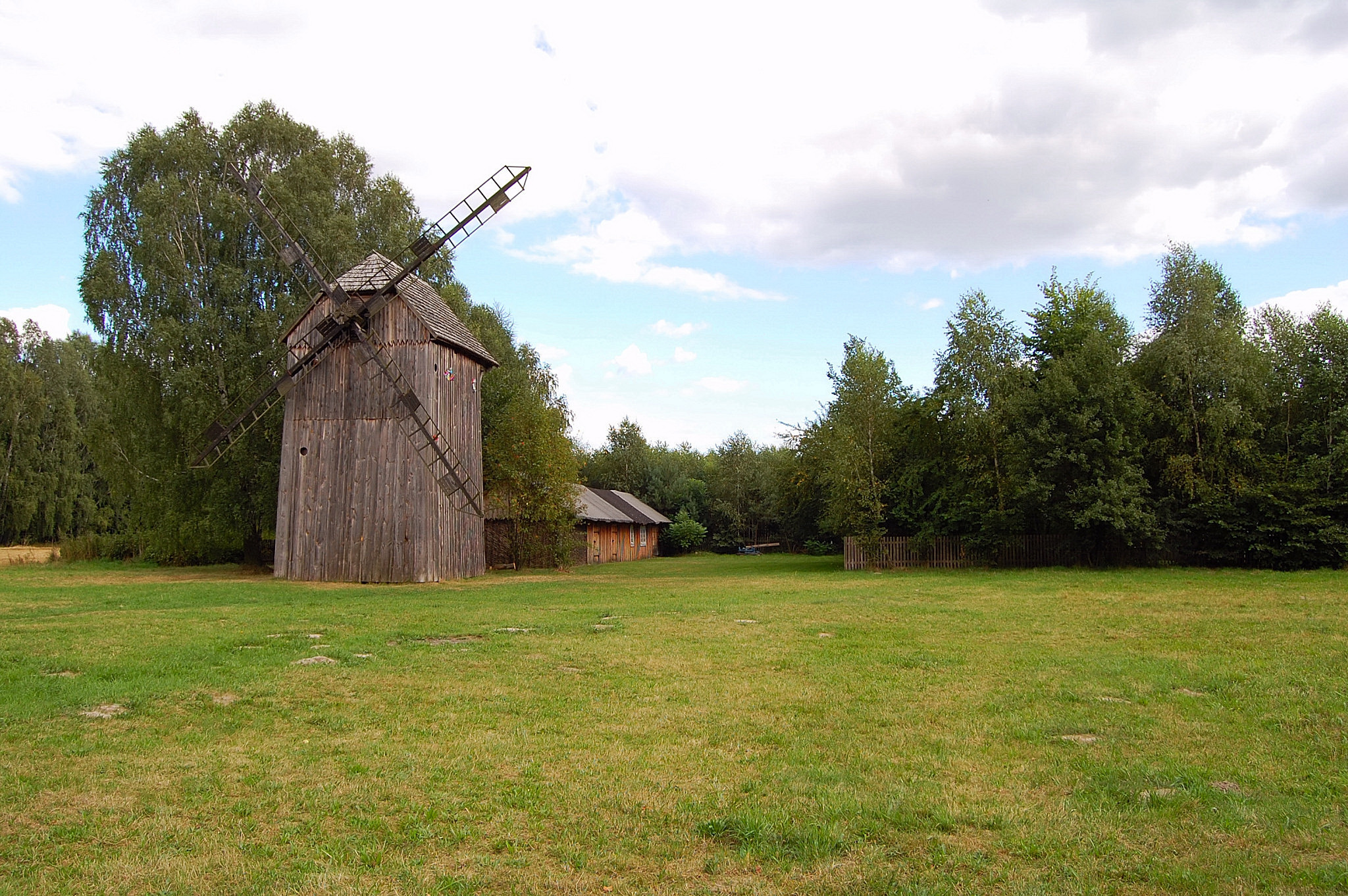

- Location within Poland
- Coordinates: 51°33′N 23°11′E
- Country: Poland
- Voivodeship: Lublin
- County: Włodawa
- Gmina: Stary Brus
- Time zone: UTC+1 (CET)
  - Summer (DST): UTC+2 (CEST)

Hola [ˈxɔla] is a village in the administrative district of Gmina Stary Brus, within Włodawa County, Lublin Voivodeship, in eastern Poland.

There is situated Open Air Museum of Material Culture of Chełm Land and Podlasie (Sansen Kultury Materialnej Chełmszczyzny i Podlasia w Holi), as well as 18th century Orthodox Church of Saints Anthony of Kiev and Martyr Paraskeva.

== History ==
Four Polish citizens were murdered by Nazi Germany in the village during World War II.
