= Uhrusk =

- Village
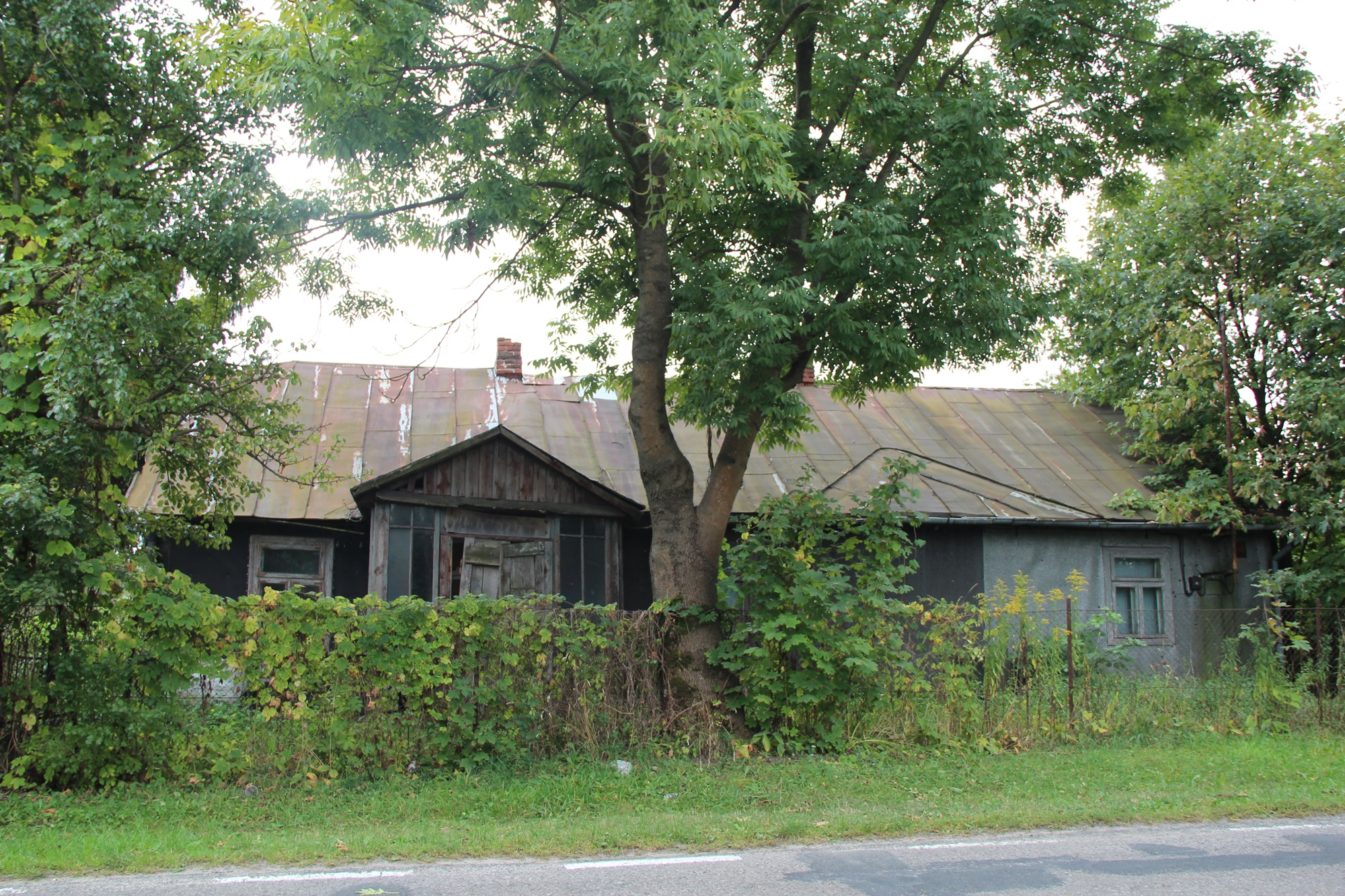
- Wooden house in Uhrusk

- Location within Poland
- Coordinates: 51°18′N 23°37′E
- Country: Poland
- Voivodeship: Lublin
- County: Włodawa
- Gmina: Wola Uhruska

Uhrusk [ˈuxrusk] is a village in the administrative district of Gmina Wola Uhruska, within Włodawa County, Lublin Voivodeship, in eastern Poland, close to the border with Ukraine.

The village has a Roman-Catholic cemetery right next to DW816. There is also an Orthodox Church of the Dormition of the Mother of God, situated on the outskirts of the village, on a low, flat elevation where, in the Middle Ages, a fortified settlement was established by Daniel of Galicia.
